= Hund's rules =

Rules to determine the ground state of an atom

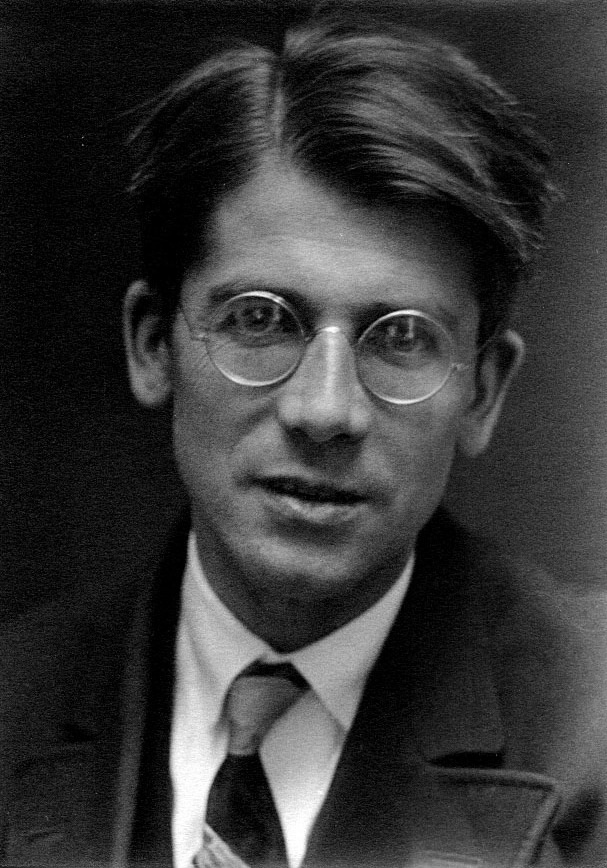
Friedrich Hund, the physicist who formulated the rules

In atomic physics and quantum chemistry, Hund's rules refers to a set of rules that German physicist Friedrich Hund formulated around 1925, which are used to determine the term symbol that corresponds to the ground state of a multi-electron atom. The first rule is especially important in chemistry, where it is often referred to simply as Hund's Rule.

The three rules are:

1. For a given electron configuration, the term with maximum multiplicity has the lowest energy. The multiplicity is equal to $2S + 1 \$, where $S$ is the total spin angular momentum for all electrons. The multiplicity is also equal to the number of unpaired electrons plus one. Therefore, the term with lowest energy is also the term with maximum $S \,$ and maximum number of unpaired electrons with equal spin angular momentum (either +1/2 or -1/2).
2. For a given multiplicity, the term with the largest value of the total orbital angular momentum quantum number $L \,$ has the lowest energy.
3. For a given term, in an atom with outermost shell half-filled or less, the level with the lowest value of the total angular momentum quantum number $J \,$ (for the operator $\boldsymbol{J}=\boldsymbol{L}+\boldsymbol{S}$) lies lowest in energy. If the outermost shell is more than half-filled, the level with the highest value of $J \,$ is lowest in energy.

These rules specify in a simple way how usual energy interactions determine which term includes the ground state. The rules assume that the repulsion between the outer electrons is much greater than the spin–orbit interaction, which is in turn stronger than any other remaining interactions. This is referred to as the LS coupling regime.

Closed shells and subshells do not contribute to the quantum numbers for total S, the total spin angular momentum and for L, the total orbital angular momentum. It can be shown that for full orbitals and suborbitals both the residual electrostatic energy (repulsion between electrons) and the spin–orbit interaction can only shift all the energy levels together. Thus when determining the ordering of energy levels in general only the outer valence electrons must be considered.

== Rule 1 ==
Due to the Pauli exclusion principle, two electrons cannot share the same set of quantum numbers within the same system; therefore, there is room for only two electrons in each spatial orbital. One of these electrons must have, (for some chosen direction z) m_{s} = 1/2, and the other must have m_{s} = −1/2. Hund's first rule states that the lowest energy atomic state is the one that maximizes the total spin quantum number for the electrons in the open subshell. The orbitals of the subshell are each occupied singly with electrons of parallel spin before double occupation occurs. (This is occasionally called the "bus seat rule" since it is analogous to the behaviour of bus passengers who tend to occupy all double seats singly before double occupation occurs.)

Two different physical explanations have been given for the increased stability of high multiplicity states. In the early days of quantum mechanics, it was proposed that electrons in different orbitals are further apart, so that electron–electron repulsion energy is reduced. However, accurate quantum-mechanical calculations (starting in the 1970s) have shown that the reason is that the electrons in singly occupied orbitals are less effectively screened or shielded from the nucleus, so that such orbitals contract and electron–nucleus attraction energy becomes greater in magnitude (or decreases algebraically).

=== Example ===
Hund's rules applied to Si.
Magnetic quantum levels	-1	0	+1
Electron occupancy		↑	↑
The up arrows signify states with up-spin.
The boxes represent different magnetic quantum numbers.

As an example, consider the ground state of silicon. The electron configuration of Si is 1s^{2} 2s^{2} 2p^{6} 3s^{2} 3p^{2} (see spectroscopic notation). We need to consider only the outer 3p^{2} electrons, for which it can be shown (see term symbols) that the possible terms allowed by the Pauli exclusion principle are ^{1}D , ^{3}P , and ^{1}S. Hund's first rule now states that the ground state term is ^{3}P (triplet P), which has S = 1. The superscript 3 is the value of the multiplicity = 2S + 1 = 3. The diagram shows the state of this term with M_{L} = 1 and M_{S} = 1.

== Rule 2 ==
This rule deals with reducing the repulsion between electrons. It can be understood from the classical picture that if all electrons are orbiting in the same direction (higher orbital angular momentum) they meet less often than if some of them orbit in opposite directions. In the latter case the repulsive force increases, which separates electrons. This adds potential energy to them, so their energy level is higher.

=== Example ===
For silicon there is only one triplet term, so the second rule is not required. The lightest atom that requires the second rule to determine the ground state term is titanium (Ti, Z = 22) with electron configuration 1s^{2} 2s^{2} 2p^{6} 3s^{2} 3p^{6} 3d^{2} 4s^{2}. In this case the open shell is 3d^{2} and the allowed terms include three singlets (^{1}S, ^{1}D, and ^{1}G) and two triplets (^{3}P and ^{3}F). (Here the symbols S, P, D, F, and G indicate that the total orbital angular momentum quantum number has values 0, 1, 2, 3 and 4, respectively, analogous to the nomenclature for naming atomic orbitals.)

We deduce from Hund's first rule that the ground state term is one of the two triplets, and from Hund's second rule that this term is ^{3}F (with $L = 3$) rather than ^{3}P (with $L = 1$). There is no ^{3}G term since its $(M_L = 4, M_S = 1)$ state would require two electrons each with $(M_L = 2, M_S = +1/2)$, in violation of the Pauli principle. (Here $M_L$ and $M_S$ are the components of the total orbital angular momentum L and total spin S along the z-axis chosen as the direction of an external magnetic field.)

== Rule 3 ==
This rule considers the energy shifts due to spin–orbit coupling. In the case where the spin–orbit coupling is weak compared to the residual electrostatic interaction, $L$ and $S$ are still good quantum numbers and the splitting is given by:
$$\begin{align}
\Delta E & = \xi (L,S) \{ \mathbf{L}\cdot\mathbf{S} \} \\
& =  \ (1/2) \xi (L,S) \{ J(J+1)-L(L+1)-S(S+1) \}
\end{align}$$

The value of $\xi (L,S)$ changes from plus to minus for shells greater than half full. This term gives the dependence of the ground state energy on the magnitude of $J \,$.

=== Examples ===
The ${}^3\!P \,$ lowest energy term of Si consists of three levels, $J = 2,1,0 \,$. With only two of six possible electrons in the shell, it is less than half-full and thus ${}^3\!P_0 \,$ is the ground state.

For sulfur (S) the lowest energy term is again ${}^3\!P \,$ with spin–orbit levels $J = 2,1,0 \,$, but now there are four of six possible electrons in the shell so the ground state is ${}^3\!P_2 \,$.

If the shell is half-filled then $L = 0 \,$, and hence there is only one value of $J \,$ (equal to $S \,$), which is the lowest energy state. For example, in phosphorus the lowest energy state has $S = 3/2,\ L = 0$ for three unpaired electrons in three 3p orbitals. Therefore, $J = S = 3/2$ and the ground state is ${}^4\!S_{3/2}\,$.

== Excited states ==
Hund's rules work best for the determination of the ground state of an atom or molecule.

They are also fairly reliable (with occasional failures) for the determination of the lowest state of a given excited electronic configuration. Thus, in the helium atom, Hund's first rule correctly predicts that the 1s2s triplet state (^{3}S) is lower than the 1s2s singlet (^{1}S). Similarly for organic molecules, the same rule predicts that the first triplet state (denoted by T_{1} in photochemistry) is lower than the first excited singlet state (S_{1}), which is generally correct.

However Hund's rules should not be used to order states other than the lowest for a given configuration. For example, the titanium atom ground state configuration is ...3d^{2} for which a naïve application of Hund's rules would suggest the ordering ^{3}F < ^{3}P < ^{1}G < ^{1}D < ^{1}S. In reality, however, ^{1}D lies below ^{1}G.
