= Term symbol =

Notation in quantum physics

In atomic physics, a term symbol is an abbreviated description of the spin, orbital and total angular momentum quantum numbers of the electrons in a multi-electron atom. So while the word symbol suggests otherwise, it represents an actual value of a physical quantity.

For a given electron configuration of an atom, its state depends also on its total angular momentum, including spin and orbital components, which are specified by the term symbol. The usual atomic term symbols assume LS coupling (also known as Russell–Saunders coupling) in which the all-electron total quantum numbers for orbital (L), spin (S) and total (J) angular momenta are good quantum numbers.

In the terminology of atomic spectroscopy, L and S together specify a term; L, S, and J specify a level; and L, S, J and the magnetic quantum number M_{J} specify a state. The conventional term symbol has the form ^{2S+1}L_{J}, where J is written optionally in order to specify a level. L is written using spectroscopic notation: for example, it is written "S", "P", "D", or "F" to represent L = 0, 1, 2, or 3 respectively. For coupling schemes other that LS coupling, such as the jj coupling that applies to some heavy elements, other notations are used to specify the term.

Term symbols apply to both neutral and charged atoms, and to their ground and excited states. Term symbols usually specify the total for all electrons in an atom, but are sometimes used to describe electrons in a given subshell or set of subshells, for example to describe each open subshell in an atom having more than one. The ground state term symbol for neutral atoms is described, in most cases, by Hund's rules. Neutral atoms of the chemical elements have the same term symbol for each column in the s-block and p-block elements, but differ in d-block and f-block elements where the ground-state electron configuration changes within a column, where exceptions to Hund's rules occur. Ground state term symbols for the chemical elements are given below.

Term symbols are also used to describe angular momentum quantum numbers for atomic nuclei and for molecules. For molecular term symbols, Greek letters are used to designate the component of orbital angular momenta along the molecular axis.

The use of the word term for an atom's electronic state is based on the Rydberg–Ritz combination principle, an empirical observation that the wavenumbers of spectral lines can be expressed as the difference of two terms. This was later summarized by the Bohr model, which identified the terms with quantized energy levels, and the spectral wavenumbers of these levels with photon energies.

Tables of atomic energy levels identified by their term symbols are available for atoms and ions in ground and excited states from the National Institute of Standards and Technology (NIST).

== Term symbols with LS coupling ==
The usual atomic term symbols assume LS coupling (also known as Russell–Saunders coupling), in which the atom's total spin quantum number S and the total orbital angular momentum quantum number L are "good quantum numbers". (Russell–Saunders coupling is named after Henry Norris Russell and Frederick Albert Saunders, who described it in 1925). The spin-orbit interaction then couples the total spin and orbital moments to give the total electronic angular momentum quantum number J. Atomic states are then well described by term symbols of the form:

$^{2S+1}L_J$

where

- S is the total spin quantum number for the atom's electrons. The value 2S + 1 written in the term symbol is the spin multiplicity, which is the number of possible values of the spin magnetic quantum number M_{S} for a given spin S.
- J is the total angular momentum quantum number for the atom's electrons. J has a value in the range from |L − S| to L + S.
- L is the total orbital quantum number in spectroscopic notation, in which the symbols for L are:
  L =	0	1	2	3	4	5	6	7	8	9	10	11	12	13	14	15	16	...
  	S	P	D	F	G	H	I	K	L	M	N	O	Q	R	T	U	V	(continued alphabetically) (Note: There is no official convention for naming orbital angular momentum values greater than 20 (symbol Z) but they are rarely needed. Some authors use Greek letters (α, β, γ, ...) after Z.)

The orbital symbols S, P, D and F are derived from the characteristics of the spectroscopic lines corresponding to s, p, d, and f orbitals: sharp, principal, diffuse, and fundamental; the rest are named in alphabetical order from G onwards (omitting J, S and P). When used to describe electronic states of an atom, the term symbol is often written following the electron configuration. For example, 1s^{2}2s^{2}2p^{2 3}P_{0} represents the ground state of a neutral carbon atom. The superscript 3 indicates that the spin multiplicity 2S + 1 is 3 (it is a triplet state), so S = 1; the letter "P" is spectroscopic notation for L = 1; and the subscript 0 is the value of J (in this case J = L − S).

Small letters refer to individual orbitals or one-electron quantum numbers, whereas capital letters refer to many-electron states or their quantum numbers.

== Terminology: terms, levels, and states ==
For a given electron configuration,

- The combination of an $S$ value and an $L$ value is called a term, and has a statistical weight (i.e., number of possible states) equal to $(2S+1)(2L+1)$;
- A combination of $S$, $L$ and $J$ is called a level. A given level has a statistical weight of $2J+1$, which is the number of possible states associated with this level in the corresponding term;
- A combination of $S$, $L$, $J$ and $M_J$ determines a single state.

The product $(2S+1)(2L+1)$ as a number of possible states $|S,M_S,L,M_L\rangle$ with given S and L is also a number of basis states in the uncoupled representation, where $S$, $M_S$, $L$, $M_L$ ($M_S$ and $M_L$ are z-axis components of total spin and total orbital angular momentum respectively) are good quantum numbers whose corresponding operators mutually commute. With given $S$ and $L$, the eigenstates $|S,M_S,L,M_L\rangle$ in this representation span function space of dimension $(2S+1)(2L+1)$, as $M_S=S,S-1,\dots, -S+1, -S$ and $M_L=L,L-1,...,-L+1,-L$. In the coupled representation where total angular momentum (spin + orbital) is treated, the associated states (or eigenstates) are $|J,M_J,S,L\rangle$ and these states span the function space with dimension of

$\sum_{J=J_{\min}=|L-S|}^{J_{\max}=L+S}(2J+1)$

as $M_J=J,J-1,\dots,-J+1,-J$. Obviously, the dimension of function space in both representations must be the same.

As an example, for $S = 1, L = 2$, there are (2×1+1)(2×2+1) = 15 different states (= eigenstates in the uncoupled representation) corresponding to the ^{3}D term, of which (2×3+1) = 7 belong to the ^{3}D_{3} (J = 3) level. The sum of $(2J+1)$ for all levels in the same term equals (2S+1)(2L+1) as the dimensions of both representations must be equal as described above. In this case, J can be 1, 2, or 3, so 3 + 5 + 7 = 15.

== Term symbol parity ==
The parity of a term symbol is calculated as

$P = (-1)^{\sum_i \ell_i} ,$

where $\ell_i$ is the orbital quantum number for each electron. $P=1$ means even parity while $P=-1$ is for odd parity. In fact, only electrons in odd orbitals (with $\ell$ odd) contribute to the total parity: an odd number of electrons in odd orbitals (those with an odd $\ell$ such as in p, f, ...) correspond to an odd term symbol, while an even number of electrons in odd orbitals correspond to an even term symbol. The number of electrons in even orbitals is irrelevant as any sum of even numbers is even. For any closed subshell, the number of electrons is $2(2\ell+1)$ which is even, so the summation of $\ell_i$ in closed subshells is always an even number. The summation of quantum numbers $\sum_{i}\ell_{i}$ over open (unfilled) subshells of odd orbitals ($\ell$ odd) determines the parity of the term symbol. If the number of electrons in this reduced summation is odd (even) then the parity is also odd (even).

When it is odd, the parity of the term symbol is indicated by a superscript letter "o", otherwise it is omitted:

^{2}P^{o}_{1/2} has odd parity, but ^{3}P_{0} has even parity.

Alternatively, parity may be indicated with a subscript letter "g" or "u", standing for gerade (German for "even") or ungerade ("odd"):

^{2}P_{1/2,u} for odd parity, and ^{3}P_{0,g} for even.

== Ground state term symbol ==
It is relatively easy to predict the term symbol for the ground state of an atom using Hund's rules. It corresponds to a state with maximum S and L.

1. Start with the most stable electron configuration. Full shells and subshells do not contribute to the overall angular momentum, so they are discarded.
  - If all shells and subshells are full then the term symbol is ^{1}S_{0}.
2. Distribute the electrons in the available orbitals, following the Pauli exclusion principle.
  - Conventionally, put 1 electron into orbital with highest m_{ℓ} and then continue filling other orbitals in descending m_{ℓ} order with one electron each, until you are out of electrons, or all orbitals in the subshell have one electron. Assign, again conventionally, all these electrons a value +1/2 of quantum magnetic spin number m_{s}.
  - If there are remaining electrons, put them in orbitals in the same order as before, but now assigning m_{s} = −1/2 to them.
3. The overall S is calculated by adding the m_{s} values for each electron. The overall S is then 1/2 times the number of unpaired electrons.
4. The overall L is calculated by adding the $m_\ell$ values for each electron (so if there are two electrons in the same orbital, add twice that orbital's $m_\ell$).
5. Calculate J as
  - if less than half of the subshell is occupied, take the minimum value J = |L − S|;
  - if more than half-filled, take the maximum value J = L + S;
  - if the subshell is half-filled, then L will be 0, so J = S.

As an example, in the case of fluorine, the electronic configuration is 1s^{2}2s^{2}2p^{5}.

1. Discard the full subshells and keep the 2p^{5} part. So there are five electrons to place in subshell p ($\ell = 1$).
2. There are three orbitals ($m_\ell = 1, 0, -1$) that can hold up to $2(2\ell +1) = 6$ electrons. The first three electrons can take m_{s} = 1/2 (↑) but the Pauli exclusion principle forces the next two to have m_{s} = −1/2 (↓) because they go to already occupied orbitals.
  	$m_\ell$		
  	+1	0	−1
  $m_s$	↑↓	↑↓	↑
3. S = 1/2 + 1/2 + 1/2 − 1/2 − 1/2 = 1/2;
4. L = 1 + 0 − 1 + 1 + 0 = 1, which is "P" in spectroscopic notation.
5. As fluorine 2p subshell is more than half filled, J = L + S = 3/2. Its ground state term symbol is then ^{2S+1}L_{J} = ^{2}P_{3/2}.

=== Atomic term symbols of the chemical elements ===
In the periodic table, because atoms of elements in a column usually have the same outer electron structure, and always have the same electron structure in the "s-block" and "p-block" elements (see block (periodic table)), all elements may share the same ground state term symbol for the column. Thus, hydrogen and the alkali metals are all ^{2}S_{1/2}, the alkaline earth metals are ^{1}S_{0}, the boron group elements are ^{2}P_{1/2}, the carbon group elements are ^{3}P_{0}, the pnictogens are ^{4}S_{3/2}, the chalcogens are ^{3}P_{2}, the halogens are ^{2}P_{3/2}, and the inert gases are ^{1}S_{0}, per the rule for full shells and subshells stated above.

Term symbols for the ground states of most chemical elements are given in the collapsed table below. In the d-block and f-block, the term symbols are not always the same for elements in the same column of the periodic table, because open shells of several d or f electrons have several closely spaced terms whose energy ordering is often perturbed by the addition of an extra complete shell to form the next element in the column.

For example, the table shows that the first pair of vertically adjacent atoms with different ground-state term symbols are V and Nb. The ^{6}D_{1/2} ground state of Nb corresponds to an excited state of V 2112 cm^{−1} above the ^{4}F_{3/2} ground state of V, which in turn corresponds to an excited state of Nb 1143 cm^{−1} above the Nb ground state. These energy differences are small compared to the 15158 cm^{−1} difference between the ground and first excited state of Ca, which is the last element before V with no d electrons.

Term symbol of the chemical elements
Group →	1	2		3	4	5	6	7	8	9	10	11	12	13	14	15	16	17	18
↓ Period
1	H^{2}S_{1/2}																		He^{1}S_{0}
2	Li^{2}S_{1/2}	Be^{1}S_{0}												B^{2}P_{1/2}	C^{3}P_{0}	N^{4}S_{3/2}	O^{3}P_{2}	F^{2}P_{3/2}	Ne^{1}S_{0}
3	Na^{2}S_{1/2}	Mg^{1}S_{0}												Al^{2}P_{1/2}	Si^{3}P_{0}	P^{4}S_{3/2}	S^{3}P_{2}	Cl^{2}P_{3/2}	Ar^{1}S_{0}
4	K^{2}S_{1/2}	Ca^{1}S_{0}		Sc^{2}D_{3/2}	Ti^{3}F_{2}	V^{4}F_{3/2}	Cr^{7}S_{3}	Mn^{6}S_{5/2}	Fe^{5}D_{4}	Co^{4}F_{9/2}	Ni^{3}F_{4}	Cu^{2}S_{1/2}	Zn^{1}S_{0}	Ga^{2}P_{1/2}	Ge^{3}P_{0}	As^{4}S_{3/2}	Se^{3}P_{2}	Br^{2}P_{3/2}	Kr^{1}S_{0}
5	Rb^{2}S_{1/2}	Sr^{1}S_{0}		Y^{2}D_{3/2}	Zr^{3}F_{2}	Nb^{6}D_{1/2}	Mo^{7}S_{3}	Tc^{6}S_{5/2}	Ru^{5}F_{5}	Rh^{4}F_{9/2}	Pd^{1}S_{0}	Ag^{2}S_{1/2}	Cd^{1}S_{0}	In^{2}P_{1/2}	Sn^{3}P_{0}	Sb^{4}S_{3/2}	Te^{3}P_{2}	I^{2}P_{3/2}	Xe^{1}S_{0}
6	Cs^{2}S_{1/2}	Ba^{1}S_{0}	1 asterisk	Lu^{2}D_{3/2}	Hf^{3}F_{2}	Ta^{4}F_{3/2}	W^{5}D_{0}	Re^{6}S_{5/2}	Os^{5}D_{4}	Ir^{4}F_{9/2}	Pt^{3}D_{3}	Au^{2}S_{1/2}	Hg^{1}S_{0}	Tl^{2}P_{1/2}	Pb^{3}P_{0}	Bi^{4}S_{3/2}	Po^{3}P_{2}	At^{2}P_{3/2}	Rn^{1}S_{0}
7	Fr^{2}S_{1/2}	Ra^{1}S_{0}	1 asterisk	Lr^{2}P_{1/2}?	Rf^{3}F_{2}	Db^{4}F_{3/2}?	Sg^{5}D_{0}?	Bh^{6}S_{5/2}?	Hs^{5}D_{4}?	Mt^{4}F_{9/2}?	Ds^{3}F_{4}?	Rg^{2}D_{5/2}?	Cn^{1}S_{0}?	Nh^{2}P_{1/2}?	Fl^{3}P_{0}?	Mc^{4}S_{3/2}?	Lv^{3}P_{2}?	Ts^{2}P_{3/2}?	Og^{1}S_{0}?
1 asterisk				La^{2}D_{3/2}	Ce^{1}G_{4}	Pr^{4}I_{9/2}	Nd^{5}I_{4}	Pm^{6}H_{5/2}	Sm^{7}F_{0}	Eu^{8}S_{7/2}	Gd^{9}D_{2}	Tb^{6}H_{15/2}	Dy^{5}I_{8}	Ho^{4}I_{15/2}	Er^{3}H_{6}	Tm^{2}F_{7/2}	Yb^{1}S_{0}
1 asterisk				Ac^{2}D_{3/2}	Th^{3}F_{2}	Pa^{4}K_{11/2}	U^{5}L_{6}	Np^{6}L_{11/2}	Pu^{7}F_{0}	Am^{8}S_{7/2}	Cm^{9}D_{2}	Bk^{6}H_{15/2}	Cf^{5}I_{8}	Es^{4}I_{15/2}	Fm^{3}H_{6}	Md^{2}F_{7/2}	No^{1}S_{0}
s-block / f-block / d-block / p-block

== Term symbols for an electron configuration ==
The process to calculate all possible term symbols for a given electron configuration is somewhat longer.

- First, the total number of possible states N is calculated for a given electron configuration. As before, the filled (sub)shells are discarded, and only the partially filled ones are kept. For a given orbital quantum number $\ell$, t is the maximum allowed number of electrons, $t=2(2\ell+1)$. If there are e electrons in a given subshell, the number of possible states is
  $N= {t \choose e} = {t! \over {e!\,(t-e)!}}.$
  As an example, consider the carbon electron structure: 1s^{2}2s^{2}2p^{2}. After removing full subshells, there are 2 electrons in a p-level ($\ell =1$), so there are
  $N = {6! \over {2!\,4!}}=15$
  different states.
- Second, all possible states are drawn. M_{L} and M_{S} for each state are calculated, with $M=\sum_{i=1}^e m_i$ where m_{i} is either $m_\ell$ or $m_s$ for the i-th electron, and M represents the resulting M_{L} or M_{S} respectively:
  	$m_\ell$
  	+1	0	−1	M_{L}	M_{S}
  all up	↑	↑		1	1
  all up	↑		↑	0	1
  all up		↑	↑	−1	1
  all down	↓	↓		1	−1
  all down	↓		↓	0	−1
  all down		↓	↓	−1	−1
  one up one down	↑↓			2	0
  one up one down	↑	↓		1	0
  one up one down	↑		↓	0	0
  one up one down	↓	↑		1	0
  one up one down		↑↓		0	0
  one up one down		↑	↓	−1	0
  one up one down	↓		↑	0	0
  one up one down		↓	↑	−1	0
  one up one down			↑↓	−2	0
- Third, the number of states for each (M_{L},M_{S}) possible combination is counted:
  		M_{S}
  		+1	0	−1
  M_{L}	+2		1
  M_{L}	+1	1	2	1
  M_{L}	0	1	3	1
  M_{L}	−1	1	2	1
  M_{L}	−2		1
- Fourth, smaller tables can be extracted representing each possible term. Each table will have the size (2L+1) by (2S+1), and will contain only "1"s as entries. The first table extracted corresponds to M_{L} ranging from −2 to +2 (so L = 2), with a single value for M_{S} (implying S = 0). This corresponds to a ^{1}D term. The remaining terms fit inside the middle 3×3 portion of the table above. Then a second table can be extracted, removing the entries for M_{L} and M_{S} both ranging from −1 to +1 (and so S = L = 1, a ^{3}P term). The remaining table is a 1×1 table, with L = S = 0, i.e., a ^{1}S term.
  S = 0, L = 2, J = 2^{1}D_{2}
  		M_{S}
  		0
  M_{L}	+2	1
  M_{L}	+1	1
  M_{L}	0	1
  M_{L}	−1	1
  M_{L}	−2	1
  S=1, L=1, J=2,1,0^{3}P_{2}, ^{3}P_{1}, ^{3}P_{0}
  		M_{S}
  		+1	0	−1
  M_{L}	+1	1	1	1
  M_{L}	0	1	1	1
  M_{L}	−1	1	1	1
  S=0, L=0, J=0^{1}S_{0}
  		M_{S}
  		0
  M_{L}	0	1
- Fifth, applying Hund's rules, the ground state can be identified (or the lowest state for the configuration of interest). Hund's rules should not be used to predict the order of states other than the lowest for a given configuration. (See examples at Hund's rules § Excited states.)
- If only two equivalent electrons are involved, there is an "Even Rule" which states that, for two equivalent electrons, the only states that are allowed are those for which the sum (L + S) is even.

=== Case of three equivalent electrons ===
- For three equivalent electrons (with the same orbital quantum number $\ell$), there is also a general formula (denoted by $X(L,S,\ell)$ below) to count the number of any allowed terms with total orbital quantum number L and total spin quantum number S.
  $$X(L,S,\ell)=
\begin{cases}
L-\left\lfloor\tfrac{L}{3}\right\rfloor, & \text{if }S=1/2\text{ and } 0\leq L <\ell\\
\ell-\left\lfloor\tfrac{L}{3}\right\rfloor, & \text{if }S=1/2\text{ and } \ell\leq L \leq 3\ell-1 \\
\left\lfloor \tfrac{L}{3}\right\rfloor -\left\lfloor \tfrac{L-\ell}{2} \right\rfloor +\left\lfloor \tfrac{L-\ell+1}{2} \right\rfloor, & \text{if }S=3/2\text{ and } 0\leq L <\ell \\
\left\lfloor \tfrac{L}{3} \right\rfloor -\left\lfloor \tfrac{L-\ell}{2} \right\rfloor, & \text{if }S=3/2\text{ and } \ell\leq L \leq 3\ell-3 \\
0, & \text{other cases}
\end{cases}$$
  where the floor function $\lfloor x \rfloor$ denotes the greatest integer not exceeding x.
  The detailed proof can be found in Renjun Xu's original paper.
- For a general electronic configuration of $\ell^k$, namely k equivalent electrons occupying one subshell, the general treatment, and computer code can also be found in this paper.

=== Alternative method using group theory ===
For configurations with at most two electrons (or holes) per subshell, an alternative and much quicker method of arriving at the same result can be obtained from group theory. The configuration 2p^{2} has the symmetry of the following direct product in the full rotation group:

Γ^{(1)} × Γ^{(1)} = Γ^{(0)} + [Γ^{(1)}] + Γ^{(2)},

which, using the familiar labels Γ^{(0)} = S, Γ^{(1)} = P and Γ^{(2)} = D, can be written as

P × P = S + [P] + D.

The square brackets enclose the anti-symmetric square. Hence the 2p^{2} configuration has components with the following symmetries:

S + D (from the symmetric square and hence having symmetric spatial wavefunctions);
P (from the anti-symmetric square and hence having an anti-symmetric spatial wavefunction).

The Pauli principle and the requirement for electrons to be described by anti-symmetric wavefunctions imply that only the following combinations of spatial and spin symmetry are allowed:

^{1}S + ^{1}D (spatially symmetric, spin anti-symmetric)
^{3}P (spatially anti-symmetric, spin symmetric).

Then one can move to step five in the procedure above, applying Hund's rules.

The group theory method can be carried out for other such configurations, like 3d^{2}, using the general formula

Γ^{(j)} × Γ^{(j)} = Γ^{(2j)} + Γ^{(2j−2)} + ⋯ + Γ^{(0)} + [Γ^{(2j−1)} + ⋯ + Γ^{(1)}].

The symmetric square will give rise to singlets (such as ^{1}S, ^{1}D, & ^{1}G), while the anti-symmetric square gives rise to triplets (such as ^{3}P & ^{3}F).

More generally, one can use

Γ^{(j)} × Γ^{(k)} = Γ^{(j+k)} + Γ^{(j+k−1)} + ⋯ + Γ^{(|j−k|)}

where, since the product is not a square, it is not split into symmetric and anti-symmetric parts. Where two electrons come from inequivalent orbitals, both a singlet and a triplet are allowed in each case.

== Summary of various coupling schemes and corresponding term symbols ==
Basic concepts for all coupling schemes:

- $\boldsymbol{\ell}$: individual orbital angular momentum vector for an electron, $\mathbf{s}$: individual spin vector for an electron, $\mathbf{j}$: individual total angular momentum vector for an electron, $\mathbf{j} = \boldsymbol{\ell} + \mathbf{s}$.
- $\mathbf{L}$: Total orbital angular momentum vector for all electrons in an atom ($\mathbf{L}=\sum_{i}\boldsymbol{\ell}_{i}$).
- $\mathbf{S}$: total spin vector for all electrons ($\mathbf{S}=\sum_{i}\mathbf{s}_{i}$).
- $\mathbf{J}$: total angular momentum vector for all electrons. The way the angular momenta are combined to form $\mathbf{J}$ depends on the coupling scheme: $\mathbf{J} = \mathbf{L} + \mathbf{S}$ for LS coupling, $\mathbf{J} = \sum_{i}\mathbf{j}_{i}$ for jj coupling, etc.
- A quantum number corresponding to the magnitude of a vector is a letter without an arrow, or without boldface (example: ℓ is the orbital angular momentum quantum number for $\boldsymbol{\ell}$ and ${{\hat{\ell}}^2}\left| \ell,m_\ell,\ldots \right\rangle ={\hbar ^2}\ell\left( \ell+1 \right)\left| \ell,m_\ell,\ldots \right\rangle$)
- The parameter called multiplicity represents the number of possible values of the total angular momentum quantum number J for certain conditions.
- For a single electron, the term symbol is not written as S is always 1/2, and L is obvious from the orbital type.
- For two electron groups A and B with their own terms, each term may represent S, L and J which are quantum numbers corresponding to the $\mathbf{S}$, $\mathbf{L}$ and $\mathbf{J}$ vectors for each group. "Coupling" of terms A and B to form a new term C means finding quantum numbers for new vectors $\mathbf{S}= \mathbf{S}_{A} + \mathbf{S}_{B}$, $\mathbf{L}=\mathbf{L}_{A}+ \mathbf{L}_{B}$ and $\mathbf{J} = \mathbf{L} + \mathbf{S}$. This example is for LS coupling and which vectors are summed in a coupling is depending on which scheme of coupling is taken. Of course, the angular momentum addition rule is that $X= X_{A}+X_{B},X_{A}+X_{B}-1, \dots, |X_{A}-X_{B}|$ where X can be s, ℓ, j, S, L, J or any other angular momentum-magnitude-related quantum number.

=== LS coupling (Russell–Saunders coupling) ===
- Coupling scheme: $\mathbf{L}$ and $\mathbf{S}$ are calculated first then $\mathbf{J}=\mathbf{L}+\mathbf{S}$ is obtained. From a practical point of view, it means L, S and J are obtained by using an addition rule of the angular momenta of given electron groups that are to be coupled.
- Electronic configuration + Term symbol: $n{\ell^N}{{(}^{(2S+1)}}{L_J})$. ${{(}^{(2S+1)}}{{L}_{J}})$ is a term which is from coupling of electrons in $n{\ell^N}$group. $n,\ell$ are principle quantum number, orbital quantum number and $n{\ell^N}$means there are N (equivalent) electrons in $n \ell$ subshell. For $L > S$, $(2S+1)$ is equal to multiplicity, a number of possible values in J (final total angular momentum quantum number) from given S and L. For $S>L$, multiplicity is $(2L+1)$ but $(2S+1)$ is still written in the term symbol. Strictly speaking, ${{(}^{(2S+1)}}{L_J})$ is called **level** and ${^{\left( 2S+1 \right)}{L}}$ is called **term**. Sometimes right superscript o is attached to the term symbol, meaning the parity $P={{\left( -1 \right)}^{\underset{i}{\mathop \sum }\, {\ell_i}}}$ of the group is odd ($P = -1$).
- Example:
  1. 3d^{7} ^{4}F_{7/2}: ^{4}F_{7/2} is level of 3d^{7} group in which are equivalent 7 electrons are in 3d subshell.
  2. 3d^{7}(^{4}F)4s4p(^{3}P^{0}) ^{6}F^{0}_{9/2}: Terms are assigned for each group (with different principal quantum number n) and rightmost level ^{6}F^{o}_{9/2} is from coupling of terms of these groups so ^{6}F^{o}_{9/2} represents final total spin quantum number S, total orbital angular momentum quantum number L and total angular momentum quantum number J in this atomic energy level. The symbols ^{4}F and ^{3}P^{o} refer to seven and two electrons respectively so capital letters are used.
  3. 4f^{7}(^{8}S^{0})5d (^{7}D^{o})6p ^{8}F_{13/2}: There is a space between 5d and (^{7}D^{o}). It means (^{8}S^{0}) and 5d are coupled to get (^{7}D^{o}). Final level ^{8}F^{o}_{13/2} is from coupling of (^{7}D^{o}) and 6p.
  4. 4f(^{2}F^{0}) 5d^{2}(^{1}G) 6s(^{2}G) ^{1}P^{0}_{1}: There is only one term ^{2}F^{o} which is isolated in the left of the leftmost space. It means (^{2}F^{o}) is coupled lastly; (^{1}G) and 6s are coupled to get (^{2}G) then (^{2}G) and (^{2}F^{o}) are coupled to get final term ^{1}P^{o}_{1}.

=== jj Coupling ===
- Coupling scheme: $\mathbf{J} = \sum_{i} \mathbf{j}_{i}$.
- Electronic configuration + Term symbol: ${{\left( {n_1}{\ell_1}_{j_1}^{N_1}{n_2}{\ell_2}_{j_2}^{N_2}\ldots \right)}_{J}}$
- Example:
  1. ${{\left( \text{6p}_{\frac{1}{2}}^{2}\text{6p}_{\frac{3}{2}}^{} \right)}^{o}}_{3/2}$: There are two groups. One is $\text{6p}^{2}_{1/2}$ and the other is $\text{6p}_{\frac{3}{2}}^{}$. In $\text{6p}^{2}_{1/2}$, there are 2 electrons having $j=1/2$ in 6p subshell while there is an electron having $j=3/2$ in the same subshell in $\text{6p}_{\frac{3}{2}}^{}$. Coupling of these two groups results in ${{{1}}}$ (coupling of j of three electrons).
  2. $\text{4d}_{5/2}^{3}\text{4d}_{3/2}^{2}~\ {{\left( \frac{9}{2},2 \right)}_{11/2}}$: $9/2$ in () is $J_1$ for 1st group $\text{4d}^{3}_{5/2}$ and 2 in () is J_{2} for 2nd group $\text{4d}^{2}_{3/2}$. Subscript 11/2 of term symbol is final J of $\mathbf{J}=\mathbf{J}_{1}+\mathbf{J}_{2}$.

=== J_{1}L_{2} coupling ===
- Coupling scheme: $\mathbf{K}=\mathbf{J}_1+\mathbf{L}_2$ and $\mathbf{J}= \mathbf{K}+\mathbf{S}_2$.
- Electronic configuration + Term symbol: ${n_1}{\ell_1}^{N_1}\left( \mathrm{term}_1 \right){n_2}{\ell_2}^{N_2}\left( \mathrm{term}_2 \right)~\ {^{\left( 2{S_2}+1 \right)}{{{\left[ K \right]}_J}}}$. For $K > S_2, (2S_2+1)$ is equal to multiplicity, a number of possible values in J (final total angular momentum quantum number) from given S_{2} and K. For $S_2 > K$, multiplicity is $(2K + 1)$ but $(2S_2 + 1)$ is still written in the term symbol.
- Example:
  1. 3p^{5}(^{2}P^{o}_{1/2})5g ^{2}[9/2]^{o}_{5}: ${J_1}= \frac{1}{2},{l_2}=4,~{s_2}=1/2$. $9/2$ is K, which comes from coupling of J_{1} and ℓ_{2}. Subscript 5 in term symbol is J which is from coupling of K and s_{2}.
  2. 4f^{13}(^{2}F^{o}_{7/2})5d^{2}(^{1}D) [7/2]^{o}_{7/2}: ${J_1} = \frac{7}{2},{L_2}=2,~{S_2}=0$. $7/2$ is K, which comes from coupling of J_{1} and L_{2}. Subscript $7/2$ in the term symbol is J which is from coupling of K and S_{2}.

=== LS_{1} coupling ===
- Coupling scheme:$\mathbf{K} \ell= \mathbf{L} +\mathbf{S_{1}}$, $\mathbf{J} = \mathbf{K}+\mathbf{S_{2}}$.
- Electronic configuration + Term symbol: ${n_1}{\ell_1}^{N_1}\left( \mathrm{term}_1\right){n_2} {\ell_2}^{N_2} \left(\mathrm{term}_2\right)\ ~L~\ {^{\left(2{S_2}+1\right)}{{{\left[K\right]}_{J}}}}$. For $K > S_2, (2S_2 + 1)$ is equal to multiplicity, a number of possible values in J (final total angular momentum quantum number) from given S_{2} and K. For $S_2 > K$, multiplicity is $(2K+1)$ but $(2S_2 + 1)$ is still written in the term symbol.
- Example:
  1. 3d^{7}(^{4}P)4s4p(^{3}P^{o}) D^{o} ^{3}[5/2]^{o}_{7/2}: ${L_1}=1,~{L_2}=1,~{S_1}=\frac{3}{2}, ~{S_2}=1$. $L=2, K=5/2, J=7/2$.

Most famous coupling schemes are introduced here but these schemes can be mixed to express the energy state of an atom. This summary is based on .

== Racah notation and Paschen notation ==
These are notations for describing states of singly excited atoms, especially noble gas atoms. Racah notation is basically a combination of LS or Russell–Saunders coupling and J_{1}L_{2} coupling. LS coupling is for a parent ion and J_{1}L_{2} coupling is for a coupling of the parent ion and the excited electron. The parent ion is an unexcited part of the atom. For example, in Ar atom excited from a ground state ...3p^{6} to an excited state ...3p^{5}4p in electronic configuration, 3p^{5} is for the parent ion while 4p is for the excited electron.

In Racah notation, states of excited atoms are denoted as $\left( ^{\left( 2{{S}_{1}}+1 \right)}{{L}_{1}}_{{{J}_{1}}} \right)n\ell\left[ K \right]_{J}^{o}$. Quantities with a subscript 1 are for the parent ion, n and ℓ are principal and orbital quantum numbers for the excited electron, K and J are quantum numbers for $\mathbf{K}=\mathbf{J}_{1}+\boldsymbol{\ell}$ and $\mathbf{J}=\mathbf{K}+\mathbf{s}$ where $\boldsymbol{\ell}$ and $\mathbf{s}$ are orbital angular momentum and spin for the excited electron respectively. “o” represents a parity of excited atom. For an inert (noble) gas atom, usual excited states are Np^{5}nℓ where N = 2, 3, 4, 5, 6 for Ne, Ar, Kr, Xe, Rn, respectively in order. Since the parent ion can only be ^{2}P_{1/2} or ^{2}P_{3/2}, the notation can be shortened to $n\ell\left[ K \right]_{J}^{o}$ or $n\ell'\left[ K \right]_{J}^{o}$, where nℓ means the parent ion is in ^{2}P_{3/2} while nℓ′ is for the parent ion in ^{2}P_{1/2} state.

Paschen notation is a somewhat odd notation; it is an old notation made to attempt to fit an emission spectrum of neon to a hydrogen-like theory. It has a rather simple structure to indicate energy levels of an excited atom. The energy levels are denoted as n′ℓ#. ℓ is just an orbital quantum number of the excited electron. n′ℓ is written in a way that 1s for (n = N + 1, ℓ = 0), 2p for (n = N + 1, ℓ = 1), 2s for (n = N + 2, ℓ = 0), 3p for (n = N + 2, ℓ = 1), 3s for (n = N + 3, ℓ = 0), etc. Rules of writing n′ℓ from the lowest electronic configuration of the excited electron are: (1) ℓ is written first, (2) n′ is consecutively written from 1 and the relation of ℓ = n′ − 1, n′ − 2, ... , 0 (like a relation between n and ℓ) is kept. n′ℓ is an attempt to describe electronic configuration of the excited electron in a way of describing electronic configuration of hydrogen atom. # is an additional number denoted to each energy level of given n′ℓ (there can be multiple energy levels of given electronic configuration, denoted by the term symbol). # denotes each level in order, for example, # = 10 is for a lower energy level than # = 9 level and # = 1 is for the highest level in a given n′ℓ. An example of Paschen notation is below.

Electronic configuration of Neon	n′ℓ	Electronic configuration of Argon	n′ℓ
1s^{2}2s^{2}2p^{6}	Ground state	[Ne]3s^{2}3p^{6}	Ground state
1s^{2}2s^{2}2p^{5}3s^{1}	1s	[Ne]3s^{2}3p^{5}4s^{1}	1s
1s^{2}2s^{2}2p^{5}3p^{1}	2p	[Ne]3s^{2}3p^{5}4p^{1}	2p
1s^{2}2s^{2}2p^{5}4s^{1}	2s	[Ne]3s^{2}3p^{5}5s^{1}	2s
1s^{2}2s^{2}2p^{5}4p^{1}	3p	[Ne]3s^{2}3p^{5}5p^{1}	3p
1s^{2}2s^{2}2p^{5}5s^{1}	3s	[Ne]3s^{2}3p^{5}6s^{1}	3s

== See also ==
- Quantum number
  - Principal quantum number
  - Azimuthal quantum number
  - Spin quantum number
  - Magnetic quantum number
- Angular quantum numbers
- Angular momentum coupling
- Molecular term symbol
