= Molecular term symbol =

Notation in physics and chemistry

In molecular physics, the molecular term symbol is a shorthand expression of the group representation and angular momenta that characterize the state of a molecule, i.e. its electronic quantum state which is an eigenstate of the electronic molecular Hamiltonian. It is the equivalent of the term symbol for the atomic case. However, the following presentation is restricted to the case of homonuclear diatomic molecules, or other symmetric molecules with an inversion centre. For heteronuclear diatomic molecules, the u/g symbol does not correspond to any exact symmetry of the electronic molecular Hamiltonian. In the case of less symmetric molecules the molecular term symbol contains the symbol of the group representation to which the molecular electronic state belongs.

It has the general form:

${}^{2S+1}\!\Lambda^{(+/-)}_{\Omega,(g/u)}$

where

- $S$ is the total spin quantum number
- $\Lambda$ (Lambda) is the projection of the orbital angular momentum along the internuclear axis
- $\Omega$ (Omega) is the projection of the total angular momentum along the internuclear axis
- $g/u$ indicates the symmetry or parity with respect to inversion ($\hat{i}$) through a centre of symmetry
- $+/-$ is the reflection symmetry along an arbitrary plane containing the internuclear axis

== Λ quantum number ==
For atoms, we use S, L, J and M_{J} to characterize a given state. In linear molecules, however, the lack of spherical symmetry destroys the relationship $[\hat{\mathbf L}^2, \hat H]=0$, so L ceases to be a good quantum number. A new set of operators have to be used instead: $\{\hat{\mathbf S}^2, \hat{\mathbf{S}}_z, \hat{\mathbf{L}}_z, \hat{\mathbf{J}}_z=\hat{\mathbf{S}}_z + \hat{\mathbf{L}}_z\}$, where the z-axis is defined along the internuclear axis of the molecule. Since these operators commute with each other and with the Hamiltonian on the limit of negligible spin-orbit coupling, their eigenvalues may be used to describe a molecule state through the quantum numbers S, M_{S}, M_{L} and M_{J}.

The cylindrical symmetry of a linear molecule ensures that positive and negative values of a given $m_\ell$ for an electron in a molecular orbital will be degenerate in the absence of spin-orbit coupling. Different molecular orbitals are classified with a new quantum number, λ, defined as

$$\lambda = |m_\ell|$$

Following the spectroscopic notation pattern, molecular orbitals are designated by a lower case Greek letter: for λ = 0, 1, 2, 3,... orbitals are called σ, π, δ, φ... respectively, analogous to the Latin letters s, p, d, f used for atomic orbitals.

Now, the total z-projection of L can be defined as

$$M_L=\sum_i {m_\ell}_i.$$

As states with positive and negative values of M_{L} are degenerate, we define

Λ = |M_{L}|,

and a capital Greek letter is used to refer to each value: Λ = 0, 1, 2, 3... are coded as Σ, Π, Δ, Φ... respectively (analogous to S, P, D, F for atomic states). The molecular term symbol is then defined as

^{2S+1}Λ

and the number of electron degenerate states (under the absence of spin-orbit coupling) corresponding to this term symbol is given by:

- (2S+1)×2 if Λ is not 0
- (2S+1) if Λ is 0.

== Ω and spin–orbit coupling ==
Spin–orbit coupling lifts the degeneracy of the electronic states. This is because the z-component of spin interacts with the z-component of the orbital angular momentum, generating a total electronic angular momentum along the molecule axis J_{z}. This is characterized by the M_{J} quantum number, where

M_{J} = M_{S} + M_{L}.

Again, positive and negative values of M_{J} are degenerate, so the pairs (M_{L}, M_{S}) and (−M_{L}, −M_{S}) are degenerate: {(1, 1/2), (−1, −1/2)}, and {(1, −1/2), (−1, 1/2)} represent two different degenerate states. These pairs are grouped together with the quantum number Ω, which is defined as the sum of the pair of values (M_{L}, M_{S}) for which M_{L} is positive. Sometimes the equation

Ω = Λ + M_{S}

is used (often Σ is used instead of M_{S}). Note that although this gives correct values for Ω it could be misleading, as obtained values do not correspond to states indicated by a given pair of values (M_{L}, M_{S}). For example, a state with (−1, −1/2) would give an Ω value of Ω = |−1| + (−1/2) = 1/2, which is wrong. Choosing the pair of values with M_{L} positive will give a Ω = 3/2 for that state.

With this, a level is given by

$${}^{2S+1}\Lambda_{\Omega}$$

Note that Ω can have negative values and subscripts r and i represent regular (normal) and inverted multiplets, respectively. For a ^{4}Π term there are four degenerate (M_{L}, M_{S}) pairs: {(1, 3/2), (−1, −3/2)}, {(1, 1/2), (−1, −1/2)}, {(1, −1/2), (−1, 1/2)}, {(1, −3/2), (−1, 3/2)}. These correspond to Ω values of 5/2, 3/2, 1/2 and −1/2, respectively. Approximating the spin–orbit Hamiltonian to first order perturbation theory, the energy level is given by

E = A M_{L} M_{S}

where A is the spin–orbit constant. For ^{4}Π the Ω values 5/2, 3/2, 1/2 and −1/2 correspond to energies of 3A/2, A/2, −A/2 and −3A/2. Despite having the same magnitude of Ω, the levels Ω = ±1/2 have different energies and so are not degenerate. States with different energies are assigned different Ω values. For states with positive values of A (which are said to be regular), increasing values of Ω correspond to increasing values of energies; on the other hand, with A negative (said to be inverted) the energy order is reversed. Including higher-order effects can lead to a spin-orbital levels or energy that do not even follow the increasing value of Ω.

When Λ = 0 there is no spin–orbit splitting to first order in perturbation theory, as the associated energy is zero. So for a given S, all of its M_{S} values are degenerate. This degeneracy is lifted when spin–orbit interaction is treated to higher order in perturbation theory, but still states with same |M_{S}| are degenerate in a non-rotating molecule. We can speak of a ^{5}Σ_{2} substate, a ^{5}Σ_{1} substate or a ^{5}Σ_{0} substate. Except for the case Ω = 0, these substates have a degeneracy of 2.

== Reflection through a plane containing the internuclear axis ==
There are an infinite number of planes containing the internuclear axis and hence there are an infinite number of possible reflections. For any of these planes, molecular terms with Λ > 0 always have a state which is symmetric with respect to this reflection and one state that is antisymmetric. Rather than labelling those situations as, e.g., ^{2}Π^{±}, the ± is omitted.

For the Σ states, however, this two-fold degeneracy disappears, and all Σ states are either symmetric under any plane containing the internuclear axis, or antisymmetric. These two situations are labeled as Σ^{+} or Σ^{−}.

== Reflection through an inversion center: u and g symmetry ==
Taking the molecular center of mass as origin of coordinates, consider the change of all electrons' position from (x_{i}, y_{i}, z_{i}) to (−x_{i}, −y_{i}, −z_{i}). If the resulting wave function is unchanged, it is said to be gerade (German for even) or have even parity; if the wave function changes sign then it is said to be ungerade (odd) or have odd parity. For a molecule with a center of inversion, all orbitals will be symmetric or antisymmetric. The resulting wavefunction for the whole multielectron system will be gerade if an even number of electrons are in ungerade orbitals, and ungerade if there are an odd number of electrons in ungerade orbitals, regardless of the number of electrons in gerade orbitals.

An alternative method for determining the symmetry of an MO is to rotate the orbital about the axis joining the two nuclei and then rotate the orbital about a line perpendicular to the axis. If the sign of the lobes remains the same, the orbital is gerade, and if the sign changes, the orbital is ungerade.

== Wigner–Witmer correlation rules ==
In 1928 Eugene Wigner and E.E. Witmer proposed rules to determine the possible term symbols for diatomic molecular states formed by the combination of a pair of atomic states with given atomic term symbols. For example, two like atoms in identical ^{3}S states can form a diatomic molecule in ^{1}Σ_{g}^{+}, ^{3}Σ_{u}^{+}, or ^{5}Σ_{g}^{+} states. For one like atom in a ^{1}S_{g} state and one in a ^{1}P_{u} state, the possible diatomic states are ^{1}Σ_{g}^{+}, ^{1}Σ_{u}^{+}, ^{1}Π_{g} and ^{1}Π_{u}. The parity of an atomic term is g if the sum of the individual angular momentum is even, and u if the sum is odd.

Simplified correlation rules for electronic states of diatomic molecules resulting from given states of separated (unlike) atoms
Atomic Term Symbols	Molecular Term Symbols
S_{g} + S_{g} or S_{u} + S_{u}	Σ^{+}
S_{g} + S_{u}	Σ^{−}
S_{g} + P_{g} or S_{u} + P_{u}	Σ^{−}, Π
S_{g} + P_{u} or S_{u} + P_{g}	Σ^{+}, Π
S_{g} + D_{g} or S_{u} + D_{u}	Σ^{+}, Π, Δ
S_{g} + D_{u} or S_{u} + D_{g}	Σ^{–}, Π, Δ
S_{g} + F_{g} or S_{u} + F_{u}	Σ^{–}, Π, Δ, Φ
S_{g} + F_{u} or S_{u} + F_{g}	Σ^{+}, Π, Δ, Φ
P_{g} + P_{g} or P_{u} + P_{u}	Σ^{+}(2), Σ^{–}, Π(2), Δ
P_{g} + P_{u}	Σ^{+}, Σ^{–}(2), Π(2), Δ
P_{g} + D_{g} or P_{u} + D_{u}	Σ^{+}, Σ^{−}(2), Π(3), Δ(2), Φ
P_{g} + D_{u} or P_{u} + D_{g}	Σ^{+}(2), Σ^{–}, Π(3), Δ(2), Φ
P_{g} + F_{g} or P_{u} + F_{u}	Σ^{+}(2), Σ^{–}, Π(3), Δ(3), Φ(2), Γ
P_{g} + F_{u} or P_{u} + F_{g}	Σ^{+}, Σ^{–}(2), Π(3), Δ(3), Φ(2), Γ
D_{g} + D_{g} or D_{u} + D_{u}	Σ^{+}(3), Σ^{–}(2), Π(4), Δ(3), Φ(2), Γ
D_{g} + D_{u}	Σ^{+}(2), Σ^{–}(3), Π(4), Δ(3), Φ(2), Γ
D_{g} + F_{g} or D_{u} + F_{u}	Σ^{+}(2), Σ^{–}(3), Π(5), Δ(4), Φ(3), Γ(2), Η
D_{g} + F_{u} or D_{u} + F_{g}	Σ^{+}(3), Σ^{–}(2), Π(5), Δ(4), Φ(3), Γ(2), Η

== Alternative empirical notation ==
Electronic states are also often identified by an empirical single-letter label. The ground state is labelled X, excited states of the same multiplicity (i.e., having the same spin quantum number) are labelled in ascending order of energy with capital letters A, B, C...; excited states having different multiplicity than the ground state are labelled with lower-case letters a, b, c... In polyatomic molecules (but not in diatomic) it is customary to add a tilde (e.g. $\tilde X$, $\tilde a$) to these empirical labels to prevent possible confusion with symmetry labels based on group representations.

== See also ==
- Molecular orbital theory
