= Multiplicity (chemistry) =

Property of an atomic or molecular energy level

In spectroscopy and quantum chemistry, the multiplicity of an energy level is defined as 2S+1, where S is the total spin angular momentum. States with multiplicity 1, 2, 3, 4, 5 are respectively called singlets, doublets, triplets, quartets and quintets.

In the ground state of an atom or molecule, the unpaired electrons usually all have parallel spin. In this case the multiplicity is also equal to the number of unpaired electrons plus one.

== Atoms ==
The multiplicity is often equal to the number of possible orientations of the total spin relative to the total orbital angular momentum L, and therefore to the number of near–degenerate levels that differ only in their spin–orbit interaction energy.

For example, the ground state of a carbon atom is ^{3}P (Term symbol). The superscript three (read as triplet) indicates that the multiplicity 2S+1 = 3, so that the total spin S = 1. This spin is due to two unpaired electrons, as a result of Hund's rule which favors the single filling of degenerate orbitals. The triplet consists of three states with spin components +1, 0 and −1 along the direction of the total orbital angular momentum, which is also 1 as indicated by the letter P. The total angular momentum quantum number J can vary from L + S = 2 to L − S = 0 in integer steps, so that J = 2, 1 or 0.

However the multiplicity equals the number of spin orientations only if S ≤ L. When S > L there are only 2L+1 orientations of total angular momentum possible, ranging from S + L to S − L. The ground state of the nitrogen atom is a ^{4}S state, for which 2S + 1 = 4 in a quartet state, S = 3/2 due to three unpaired electrons. For an S state, L = 0 so that J can only be 3/2 and there is only one level even though the multiplicity is 4.

== Molecules ==
Most stable organic molecules have complete electron shells with no unpaired electrons and therefore have singlet ground states. This is true also for inorganic molecules containing only main-group elements. Important exceptions are dioxygen (O_{2}) as well as methylene (CH_{2}) and other carbenes.

However, higher spin ground states are very common in coordination complexes of transition metals. A simple explanation of the spin states of such complexes is provided by crystal field theory.

=== Dioxygen ===
The highest occupied orbital energy level of dioxygen is a pair of antibonding π* orbitals. In the ground state of dioxygen, this energy level is occupied by two electrons of the same spin, as shown in the molecular orbital diagram. The molecule, therefore, has two unpaired electrons and is in a triplet state.

In contrast, the first and second excited states of dioxygen are both states of singlet oxygen. Each has two electrons of opposite spin in the π* level so that S = 0 and the multiplicity is 2S + 1 = 1 in consequence.

In the first excited state, the two π* electrons are paired in the same orbital, so that there are no unpaired electrons. In the second excited state, however, the two π* electrons occupy different orbitals with opposite spin. Each is therefore an unpaired electron, but the total spin is zero and the multiplicity is 2S + 1 = 1 despite the two unpaired electrons. The multiplicity of the second excited state is therefore not equal to the number of its unpaired electrons plus one, and the rule which is usually true for ground states is invalid for this excited state.

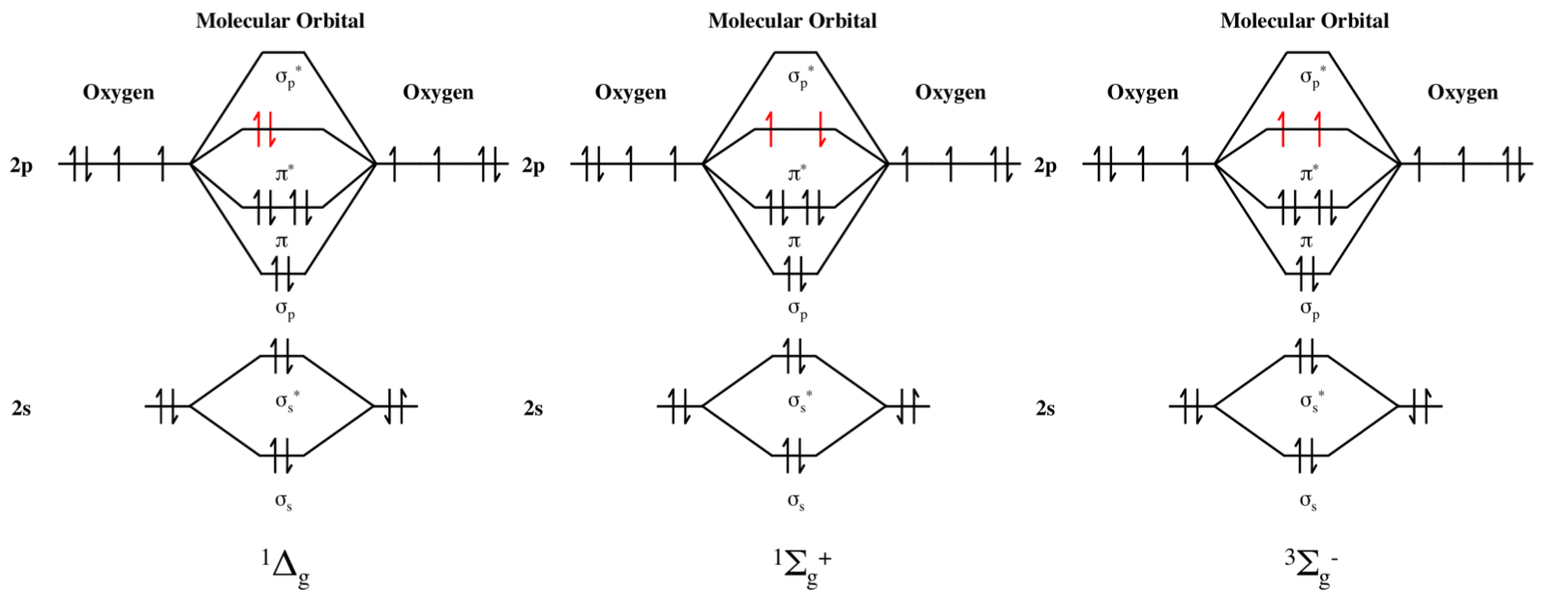
Molecular orbital diagram of two singlet excited states and triplet ground state of O_{2}. From left to right, the diagrams are for: ^{1}Δ_{g} singlet oxygen (first excited state), ^{1}Σ^{+}_{g} singlet oxygen (second excited state), and ^{3}Σ^{−}_{g} triplet oxygen (ground state).

=== Carbenes ===
In organic chemistry, carbenes are molecules which have carbon atoms with only six electrons in their valence shells and therefore disobey the octet rule. Carbenes generally split into singlet carbenes and triplet carbenes, named for their spin multiplicities. Both have two non-bonding electrons; in singlet carbenes these exist as a lone pair and have opposite spins so that there is no net spin, while in triplet carbenes these electrons have parallel spins.

== See also ==
- Quantum numbers
  - Principal quantum number
  - Azimuthal quantum number
  - Magnetic quantum number
  - Spin quantum number
- Exchange interaction
- Term symbol
- Slater's rules
- Effective nuclear charge
- Shielding effect

== Bibliography ==
- Atkins, Peter; de Paula, Julio (2006). Atkins' Physical Chemistry (8th ed.). United States: Oxford University Press. ISBN 0-7167-8759-8.
- Clayden, Jonathan; Greeves, Nick; Warren, Stuart; Wothers, Peter (2001). Organic Chemistry. United States: Oxford University Press. ISBN 0-19-850346-6.
- Levine, Ira N. (1991). Quantum Chemistry (4th ed.). United States: Prentice-Hall. ISBN 0-205-12770-3.
- Miessler, Gary L.; Tarr, Donald A. (1999). Inorganic Chemistry (2nd ed.). Prentice-Hall. ISBN 0-13-841891-8.
