= Electron pair =

Two electrons that occupy the same molecular orbital but have opposite spins

In chemistry, an electron pair or Lewis pair consists of two electrons that occupy the same atomic or molecular orbital but have opposite spins. Gilbert N. Lewis introduced the concepts of both the electron pair and the covalent bond in a landmark paper he published in 1916.

MO diagrams depicting covalent (left) and polar covalent (right) bonding in a diatomic molecule. In both cases a bond is created by the formation of an electron pair.

Because electrons are fermions, the Pauli exclusion principle forbids these particles from having all the same quantum numbers. Therefore, for two electrons to occupy the same orbital, and thereby have the same orbital quantum number, they must have different spin quantum numbers. This also limits the number of electrons in the same orbital to two.

The pairing of spins is often energetically favorable, and electron pairs therefore play a large role in chemistry. They can form a chemical bond between two atoms, or they can occur as a lone pair of valence electrons. They also fill the core levels of an atom.

Because the spins are paired, the magnetic moment of the electrons cancel one another, and the pair's contribution to magnetic properties is generally diamagnetic.

Although a strong tendency to pair off electrons can be observed in chemistry, it is also possible for electrons to occur as unpaired electrons.

In the case of metallic bonding, the magnetic moments also compensate to a large extent, but the bonding is more communal, so that individual pairs of electrons cannot be distinguished and it is better to consider the electrons as a collective 'sea'.

== See also ==
- Electron pair production
- Frustrated Lewis pair
- Jemmis mno rules
- Lewis acids and bases
- Lewis structure
- Nucleophile
- Polyhedral skeletal electron pair theory
