= DMX (disambiguation) =

DMX (born Earl Simmons; 1970–2021) was an American rapper.

DMX may also refer to:

== People ==
- DMX Krew (born Ed Upton), British electronic music artist
- Davy DMX (born David Reeves; born 1960), American hip hop music pioneer

== Science ==
- 5-Dehydro-m-xylylene, the first organic molecule known to violate Hund's rule
- Depressive mixed state, a psychological disorder
- DmX gene, an extremely large WD-protein coding gene found in eukaryotes

== Technology ==
- DMX512, a communications protocol that is most commonly used to control stage lighting and effects
- Symmetrix DMX, a series of enterprise storage arrays by EMC Corporation
- Data Mining Extensions, a query language for data mining models
- DMX, a protocol for fracture modeling in geoscience

== Other uses ==
- DMX (music service), a retail environment company
- Oberheim DMX, a drum machine manufactured by Oberheim
- National Weather Service Des Moines, Iowa, whose office identification code is DMX

== See also ==
- Dextromethorphan (DXM)
