= Pauli exclusion principle =

Quantum mechanics principle

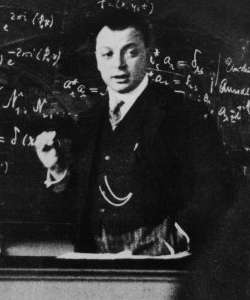
Wolfgang Pauli during a lecture in Copenhagen (1929). Wolfgang Pauli formulated the Pauli exclusion principle.

In quantum mechanics, the Pauli exclusion principle states that two or more identical particles with half-integer spins (i.e., fermions) cannot simultaneously occupy the same quantum state. This principle was formulated by Austrian physicist Wolfgang Pauli in 1925 for electrons, and later extended to all fermions with his spin–statistics theorem of 1940.

In the case of electrons in atoms, the exclusion principle can be stated as follows: in a poly-electron atom it is impossible for any two electrons to have the same two values of all four of their quantum numbers, which are: n, the principal quantum number; ℓ, the azimuthal quantum number; m_{ℓ}, the magnetic quantum number; and m_{s}, the spin quantum number. For example, if two electrons reside in the same orbital, then their values of n, ℓ, and m_{ℓ} are equal. In that case, the two values of m_{s} (spin) pair must be different. Since the only two possible values for the spin projection m_{s} are +1/2 and −1/2, it follows that one electron must have m_{s} = +1/2 and one m_{s} = −1/2.

Particles with an integer spin (bosons) are not subject to the Pauli exclusion principle. Any number of identical bosons can occupy the same quantum state, such as photons produced by a laser, or atoms found in a Bose–Einstein condensate.

A rigorous statement which justifies the exclusion principle is: under the exchange of two identical particles, the total (many-particle) wave function is antisymmetric for fermions and symmetric for bosons. This means that if the space and spin coordinates of two identical particles are interchanged, then the total wave function changes sign (from positive to negative or vice versa) for fermions, but does not change sign for bosons. So, if hypothetically two fermions were in the same state—for example, in the same atom in the same orbital with the same spin—then interchanging them would change nothing and the total wave function would be unchanged. However, the only way a total wave function can both change sign (which is required for fermions), and also remain unchanged, is that such a function must be zero everywhere, which means such a state cannot exist. This reasoning does not apply to bosons because the sign does not change.

== Overview ==
The Pauli exclusion principle describes the behavior of all fermions (particles with half-integer spin), while bosons (particles with integer spin) are subject to other principles. Fermions include elementary particles such as quarks, electrons and neutrinos. Additionally, baryons such as protons and neutrons (subatomic particles composed from three quarks) and some atoms (such as helium-3) are fermions, and are therefore described by the Pauli exclusion principle as well. Atoms can have different overall spin, which determines whether they are fermions or bosons: for example, helium-3 has spin 1/2 and is therefore a fermion, whereas helium-4 has spin 0 and is a boson. The Pauli exclusion principle underpins many properties of everyday matter, from its large-scale stability to the chemical behavior of atoms.

Half-integer spin means that the intrinsic angular momentum value of fermions is $\hbar = h/2\pi$ (reduced Planck constant) times a half-integer (1/2, 3/2, 5/2, etc.). In the theory of quantum mechanics, fermions are described by antisymmetric states. In contrast, particles with integer spin (bosons) have symmetric wave functions and may share the same quantum states. Bosons include the photon, the Cooper pairs which are responsible for superconductivity, and the W and Z bosons. Fermions take their name from the Fermi–Dirac statistical distribution, which they obey, and bosons take theirs from the Bose–Einstein distribution.

== History ==
In the early 20th century it became evident that atoms and molecules with even numbers of electrons are more chemically stable than those with odd numbers of electrons. In the 1916 article "The Atom and the Molecule" by Gilbert N. Lewis, for example, the third of his six postulates of chemical behavior states that the atom tends to hold an even number of electrons in any given shell, and especially to hold eight electrons, which he assumed to be typically arranged symmetrically at the eight corners of a cube. In 1919 chemist Irving Langmuir suggested that the periodic table could be explained if the electrons in an atom were connected or clustered in some manner. Groups of electrons were thought to occupy a set of electron shells around the nucleus. In 1922, Niels Bohr updated his model of the atom by assuming that certain numbers of electrons (for example 2, 8 and 18) corresponded to stable "closed shells".

Pauli looked for an explanation for these numbers, which were at first only empirical. At the same time he was trying to explain experimental results of the Zeeman effect in atomic spectroscopy and in ferromagnetism. He found an essential clue in a 1924 paper by Edmund C. Stoner, which pointed out that, for a given value of the principal quantum number (n), the number of energy levels of a single electron in the alkali metal spectra in an external magnetic field, where all degenerate energy levels are separated, is equal to the number of electrons in the closed shell of the noble gases for the same value of n. This led Pauli to realize that the complicated numbers of electrons in closed shells can be reduced to the simple rule of one electron per state if the electron states are defined using four quantum numbers. For this purpose he introduced a new two-valued quantum number, identified by Samuel Goudsmit and George Uhlenbeck as electron spin.

== Connection to quantum state symmetry ==
In his Nobel lecture, Pauli clarified the importance of quantum state symmetry to the exclusion principle:

Among the different classes of symmetry, the most important ones (which moreover for two particles are the only ones) are the symmetrical class, in which the wave function does not change its value when the space and spin coordinates of two particles are permuted, and the antisymmetrical class, in which for such a permutation the wave function changes its sign...[The antisymmetrical class is] the correct and general wave mechanical formulation of the exclusion principle.

The Pauli exclusion principle with a single-valued many-particle wavefunction is equivalent to requiring the wavefunction to be antisymmetric with respect to exchange. If $|x\rangle$ and $|y\rangle$ range over the basis vectors of the Hilbert space describing a one-particle system, then the tensor product produces the basis vectors $|x,y\rangle=|x\rangle\otimes|y\rangle$ of the Hilbert space describing a system of two such particles. Any two-particle state can be represented as a superposition (i.e. sum) of these basis vectors:

$$|\psi\rangle = \sum_{x,y} A(x,y) |x,y\rangle,$$

where each A(x, y) is a (complex) scalar coefficient. Antisymmetry under exchange means that A(x, y) = −A(y, x). This implies A(x, y) = 0 when x = y, which is Pauli exclusion. It is true in any basis since local changes of basis keep antisymmetric matrices antisymmetric.

Conversely, if the diagonal quantities A(x, x) are zero in every basis, then the wavefunction component

$$A(x,y)=\langle\psi|x,y\rangle=\langle\psi|\Big(|x\rangle\otimes|y\rangle\Big)$$

is necessarily antisymmetric. To prove it, consider the matrix element

$$\langle\psi| \Big((|x\rangle + |y\rangle)\otimes(|x\rangle + |y\rangle)\Big).$$

This is zero, because the two particles have zero probability to both be in the superposition state $|x\rangle + |y\rangle$. But this is equal to

$$\langle \psi |x,x\rangle + \langle \psi |x,y\rangle + \langle \psi |y,x\rangle + \langle \psi | y,y \rangle.$$

The first and last terms are diagonal elements and are zero, and the whole sum is equal to zero. So the wavefunction matrix elements obey:

$$\langle \psi|x,y\rangle + \langle\psi |y,x\rangle = 0,$$

or

$$A(x,y) = -A(y,x).$$

For a system with n > 2 particles, the multi-particle basis states become n-fold tensor products of one-particle basis states, and the coefficients of the wavefunction $A(x_1,x_2,\ldots,x_n)$ are identified by n one-particle states. The condition of antisymmetry states that the coefficients must flip sign whenever any two states are exchanged: $A(\ldots,x_i,\ldots,x_j,\ldots)=-A(\ldots,x_j,\ldots,x_i,\ldots)$ for any $i\ne j$. The exclusion principle is the consequence that, if $x_i=x_j$ for any $i\ne j,$ then $A(\ldots,x_i,\ldots,x_j,\ldots)=0.$ This shows that none of the n particles may be in the same state.

=== Advanced quantum theory ===
According to the spin–statistics theorem, particles with integer spin occupy symmetric quantum states, and particles with half-integer spin occupy antisymmetric states; furthermore, only integer or half-integer values of spin are allowed by the principles of quantum mechanics. In relativistic quantum field theory, the Pauli principle follows from applying a rotation operator in imaginary time to particles of half-integer spin.

In one dimension, bosons, as well as fermions, can obey the exclusion principle. A one-dimensional Bose gas with delta-function repulsive interactions of infinite strength is equivalent to a gas of free fermions. The reason for this is that, in one dimension, the exchange of particles requires that they pass through each other; for infinitely strong repulsion this cannot happen. This model is described by a quantum nonlinear Schrödinger equation. In momentum space, the exclusion principle is valid also for finite repulsion in a Bose gas with delta-function interactions, as well as for interacting spins and Hubbard model in one dimension, and for other models solvable by Bethe ansatz. The ground state in models solvable by Bethe ansatz is a Fermi sphere.

== Applications ==
=== Atoms ===
The Pauli exclusion principle explains a wide variety of physical phenomena. One particularly important consequence of the principle is the elaborate electron shell structure of atoms and the way atoms share electrons, explaining the variety of chemical elements and their chemical combinations. An electrically neutral atom contains bound electrons equal in number to the protons in its nucleus. One electron cannot occupy the same quantum state as another, so electrons "stack" within an atom, i.e. have different spins while at the same electron orbital as described below.

The helium atom has two bound electrons, both of which can occupy the lowest-energy (1s) states by acquiring opposite spin. Spin is part of the quantum state of the electron, so the two electrons are in different quantum states and do not violate the Pauli principle. However, the spin can take only two values. In a lithium atom (Li), with three bound electrons, by the exclusion principle, the third electron cannot reside in a 1s state, and must occupy a higher-energy state instead. The lowest available state is 2s, so the ground state of Li is 1s^{2}2s. Similarly, successively larger elements must have shells of successively higher energy. The chemical properties of an element largely depend on the number of electrons in the outermost shell; atoms with different numbers of occupied electron shells but the same number of electrons in the outermost shell have similar properties, which gives rise to the periodic table of the elements.

To test the Pauli exclusion principle for the helium atom, Gordon Drake of the University of Windsor carried out very precise calculations for hypothetical states of the He atom that violate it, which are called paronic states. Later, K. Deilamian et al. used an atomic beam spectrometer to search for the paronic state 1s2s ^{1}S_{0} calculated by Drake. The search was unsuccessful and showed that the statistical weight of this paronic state has an upper limit of 5×10^{−6}. (The exclusion principle implies a weight of zero.)

=== Solid state properties ===
In conductors and semiconductors, there are very large numbers of molecular orbitals which effectively form a continuous band structure of energy levels. In strong conductors (metals) electrons are so degenerate that they cannot even contribute much to the thermal capacity of a metal. Many mechanical, electrical, magnetic, optical and chemical properties of solids are the direct consequence of Pauli exclusion.

=== Stability of matter ===
The stability of each electron state in an atom is described by the quantum theory of the atom, which shows that close approach of an electron to the nucleus necessarily increases the electron's kinetic energy, an application of the uncertainty principle of Heisenberg. However, stability of large systems with many electrons and many nucleons is a different question, and requires the Pauli exclusion principle.

It has been shown that the Pauli exclusion principle is responsible for the fact that ordinary bulk matter is stable and occupies volume. This suggestion was first made in 1931 by Paul Ehrenfest, who pointed out that the electrons of each atom cannot all fall into the lowest-energy orbital and must occupy successively larger shells. Atoms, therefore, occupy a volume and cannot be squeezed too closely together.

The first rigorous proof was provided in 1967 by Freeman Dyson and Andrew Lenard (de), who considered the balance of attractive (electron–nuclear) and repulsive (electron–electron and nuclear–nuclear) forces and showed that ordinary matter would collapse and occupy a much smaller volume without the Pauli principle. A much simpler proof was found later by Elliott H. Lieb and Walter Thirring in 1975. They provided a lower bound on the quantum energy in terms of the Thomas-Fermi model, which is stable due to a theorem of Teller. The proof used a lower bound on the kinetic energy which is now called the Lieb–Thirring inequality.

The consequence of the Pauli principle here is that electrons of the same spin are kept apart by a repulsive exchange interaction, which is a short-range effect, acting simultaneously with the long-range electrostatic or Coulombic force. This effect is partly responsible for the everyday observation in the macroscopic world that two solid objects cannot be in the same place at the same time.

=== Astrophysics ===
Dyson and Lenard did not consider the extreme magnetic or gravitational forces that occur in some astronomical objects. In 1995 Elliott Lieb and coworkers showed that the Pauli principle still leads to stability in intense magnetic fields such as in neutron stars, although at a much higher density than in ordinary matter. It is a consequence of general relativity that, in sufficiently intense gravitational fields, matter collapses to form a black hole.

Astronomy provides a spectacular demonstration of the effect of the Pauli principle, in the form of white dwarf and neutron stars. In both bodies, the atomic structure is disrupted by extreme pressure, but the stars are held in hydrostatic equilibrium by degeneracy pressure, also known as Fermi pressure. This exotic form of matter is known as degenerate matter. The immense gravitational force of a star's mass is normally held in equilibrium by thermal pressure caused by heat produced in thermonuclear fusion in the star's core. In white dwarfs, which do not undergo nuclear fusion, an opposing force to gravity is provided by electron degeneracy pressure. In neutron stars, subject to even stronger gravitational forces, electrons have merged with protons to form neutrons. Neutrons are capable of producing an even higher degeneracy pressure, neutron degeneracy pressure, albeit over a shorter range. This can stabilize neutron stars from further collapse, but at a smaller size and higher density than a white dwarf. Neutron stars are the most "rigid" objects known; their Young modulus (or more accurately, bulk modulus) is 20 orders of magnitude larger than that of diamond. However, even this enormous rigidity can be overcome by the gravitational field of a neutron star mass exceeding the Tolman–Oppenheimer–Volkoff limit, leading to the formation of a black hole.

== See also ==
- Exchange interaction
- Exchange symmetry
- Fermi heap and Fermi hole
- Hund's rule of maximum multiplicity
- Pauli effect
