= Unpaired electron =

Type of lepton that orbits an atom on its own

Periodic table with elements that have unpaired electrons coloured

In chemistry, an unpaired electron is an electron that occupies an orbital of an atom singly, rather than as part of an electron pair. Each atomic orbital of an atom (specified by the three quantum numbers n, l and m) has a capacity to contain two electrons (electron pair) with opposite spins. As the formation of electron pairs is often energetically favourable, either in the form of a chemical bond or as a lone pair, unpaired electrons are relatively uncommon in chemistry, because an entity that carries an unpaired electron is usually rather reactive. In organic chemistry they typically only occur briefly during a reaction on an entity called a radical; however, they play an important role in explaining reaction pathways.

Radicals are uncommon in s- and p-block chemistry, since the unpaired electron occupies a valence p orbital or an sp, sp^{2} or sp^{3} hybrid orbital. These orbitals are strongly directional and therefore overlap to form strong covalent bonds, favouring dimerisation of radicals. Radicals can be stable if dimerisation would result in a weak bond or the unpaired electrons are stabilised by delocalisation. In contrast, radicals in d- and f-block chemistry are very common. The less directional, more diffuse d and f orbitals, in which unpaired electrons reside, overlap less effectively, form weaker bonds and thus dimerisation is generally disfavoured. These d and f orbitals also have comparatively smaller radial extension, disfavouring overlap to form dimers.

Relatively more stable entities with unpaired electrons do exist, e.g. the nitric oxide molecule has one. According to Hund's rule, the spins of unpaired electrons are aligned parallel and this gives these molecules paramagnetic properties.

The most stable examples of unpaired electrons are found on the atoms and ions of lanthanides and actinides. The incomplete f-shell of these entities does not interact very strongly with the environment they are in and this prevents them from being paired. The ions with the largest number of unpaired electrons are Gd^{3+} and Cm^{3+} with seven unpaired electrons.

An unpaired electron has a magnetic dipole moment, while an electron pair has no dipole moment because the two electrons have opposite spins so their magnetic dipole fields are in opposite directions and cancel. Thus an atom with unpaired electrons acts as a magnetic dipole and interacts with a magnetic field. Only elements with unpaired electrons exhibit paramagnetism, ferromagnetism, and antiferromagnetism.
