= 5-Dehydro-m-xylylene =

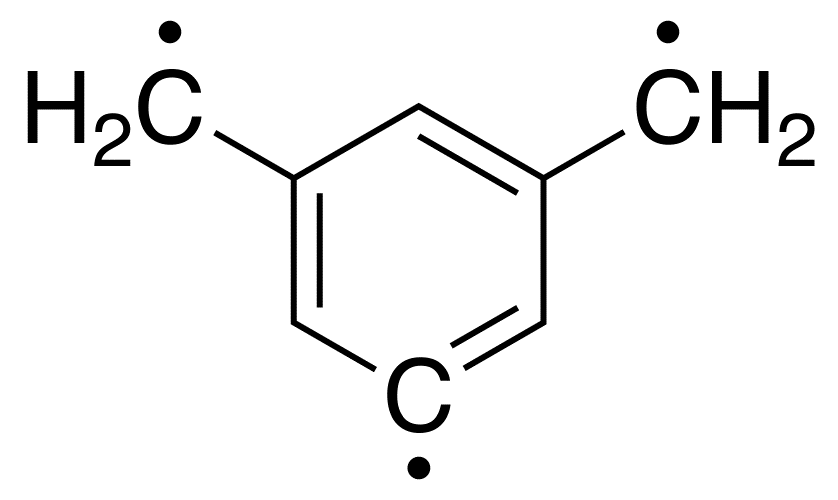
- 5-Dehydro-m-xylylene

Names
- Preferred IUPAC name 3,5-Di(ylomethyl)benzen-1-yl
- Other names 5-dehydro-m-xylylene, DMX

Identifiers
CAS Number	681440-83-5
3D model (JSmol)	Interactive image
- InChI: InChI=1S/C8H7/c1-7-4-3-5-8(2)6-7/h4-6H,1-2H2 Key: FISNMDKRRJMFAO-UHFFFAOYSA-N
- SMILES: [CH2]C(C1)=C-[C]=C-C=1[CH2]

Properties
Chemical formula	C_{8}H_{7}
Molar mass	103.14 g/mol
- Except where otherwise noted, data are given for materials in their standard state (at 25 °C [77 °F], 100 kPa). verify (what is ?) Infobox references

5-Dehydro-m-xylylene (DMX) is an aromatic organic triradical and the first known organic molecule to violate Hund's Rule.

Its electronic ground state is an open-shell doublet rather than a quartet; that is, the unpaired electrons in the three singly occupied molecular orbitals form a low-spin state in which one electron has its spin-state opposed to the other two. The net result is that there is only one unopposed spin. Hund's rule would predict that the ground state would have all three radical electrons with the same spin-state as each other (none opposed), for a greater total spin. As a result of having non-paired electrons in both spin states coupled together, this compound exhibits antiferromagnetism. Though similar ground states are observed in molecules containing transition metal atoms, it is unprecedented in organic molecules.

The 5-dehydro-m-xylylene anion (DMX^{−}) has also been studied extensively. It has a triplet ground state consisting of a phenyl anion and a m-xylylene biradical.
