= Spectroscopic notation =

Format for notating atoms and molecules

Spectroscopic notation provides a way to specify atomic ionization states, atomic orbitals, and molecular orbitals.

== Ionization states ==
Spectroscopists customarily refer to the spectrum arising from a given ionization state of a given element by the element's symbol followed by a Roman numeral. The numeral I is used for spectral lines associated with the neutral element, II for those from the first ionization state, III for those from the second ionization state, and so on. For example, "He I" denotes lines of neutral helium, and "C IV" denotes lines arising from the third ionization state, C^{3+}, of carbon. This notation is used, for example, to retrieve data from the NIST Atomic Spectrum Database.

== Atomic and molecular orbitals ==
Before atomic orbitals were understood, spectroscopists discovered various distinctive series of spectral lines in atomic spectra, which they identified by letters. These letters were later associated with the azimuthal quantum number, ℓ. The letters, "s", "p", "d", and "f", for the first four values of ℓ were chosen to be the first letters of properties of the spectral series observed in alkali metals. Other letters for subsequent values of ℓ were assigned in alphabetical order, omitting the letter "j" because some languages do not distinguish between the letters "i" and "j":

letter	name	ℓ
s	sharp	0
p	principal	1
d	diffuse	2
f	fundamental	3
g		4
h		5
i		6
k		7
l		8
m		9
n		10
o		11
q		12
r		13
t		14
u		15
v		16
...		...

This notation is used to specify electron configurations and to create the term symbol for the electron states in a multi-electron atom. When writing a term symbol, the above scheme for a single electron's orbital quantum number is applied to the total orbital angular momentum associated to an electron state.

=== Molecular spectroscopic notation ===
The spectroscopic notation of molecules uses Greek letters to represent the modulus of the orbital angular momentum along the internuclear axis. The quantum number that represents this angular momentum is Λ.

Λ = 0, 1, 2, 3, ...
Symbols: Σ, Π, Δ, Φ

For Σ states, one denotes if there is a reflection in a plane containing the nuclei (symmetric), using the + above. The − is used to indicate that there is not.

For homonuclear diatomic molecules, the index g or u denotes the existence of a center of symmetry (or inversion center) and indicates the symmetry of the vibronic wave function with respect to the point-group inversion operation i. Vibronic states that are symmetric with respect to i are denoted g for gerade (German for "even"), and unsymmetric states are denoted u for ungerade (German for "odd").

== Quarkonium ==
For mesons whose constituents are a heavy quark and its own antiquark (quarkonium) the same notation applies as for atomic states. However, uppercase letters are used.

Furthermore, the first number is (as in nuclear physics) $n = N+1$ where $N$ is the number of nodes in the radial wave function, while in atomic physics $n = N+\ell+1$ is used. Hence, a 1P state in quarkonium corresponds to a 2p state in an atom or positronium.

== See also ==
- Azimuthal quantum number
- Electron configuration
- Mnemonics for orbital letters
- Principal quantum number
- Term symbol
- X-ray notation
- Molecular symmetry
