= Hund's rule of maximum multiplicity =

Rule used to predict the ground state of an atom or molecule with open electron shells

Hund's rule of maximum multiplicity is a rule based on observation of atomic spectra, which is used to predict the ground state of an atom or molecule with one or more open electronic shells. The rule states that in a subshell of an atom, electrons are first singly filled with same spin before they are filled doubly. This implies that if two or more orbitals of equal energy are available, electrons will occupy them singly before filling them in pairs. The rule, discovered by Friedrich Hund in 1925, is of important use in atomic chemistry, spectroscopy, and quantum chemistry, and is often abbreviated to Hund's rule, ignoring Hund's other two rules.

== Atoms ==
The multiplicity of a state is defined as 2S + 1, where S is the total electronic spin. A high multiplicity state is therefore the same as a high-spin state. The lowest-energy state with maximum multiplicity usually has unpaired electrons all with parallel spin. Since the spin of each electron is 1/2, the total spin is one-half the number of unpaired electrons, and the multiplicity is the number of unpaired electrons + 1. For example, the nitrogen atom ground state has three unpaired electrons of parallel spin, so that the total spin is 3/2 and the multiplicity is 4.

The lower energy and increased stability of the atom arise because the high-spin state has unpaired electrons of parallel spin, which must reside in different spatial orbitals according to the Pauli exclusion principle. An early but incorrect explanation of the lower energy of high multiplicity states was that the different occupied spatial orbitals create a larger average distance between electrons, reducing electron-electron repulsion energy. However, quantum-mechanical calculations with accurate wave functions since the 1970s have shown that the actual physical reason for the increased stability is a decrease in the screening of electron-nuclear attractions, so that the unpaired electrons can approach the nucleus more closely and the electron-nuclear attraction is increased.

As a result of Hund's rule, constraints are placed on the way atomic orbitals are filled in the ground state using the Aufbau principle. Before any two electrons occupy an orbital in a subshell, other orbitals in the same subshell must first each contain one electron. Also, the electrons filling a subshell will have parallel spin before the shell starts filling up with the opposite spin electrons (after the first orbital gains a second electron). As a result, when filling up atomic orbitals, the maximum number of unpaired electrons (and hence maximum total spin state) is assured.

For example, in the oxygen atom, the 2p^{4} subshell arranges its electrons as [↑↓] [↑] [↑] rather than [↑↓] [↑] [↓] or [↑↓] [↑↓][ ]. The manganese (Mn) atom has a 3d^{5} electron configuration with five unpaired electrons all of parallel spin, corresponding to a ^{6}S ground state. The superscript 6 is the value of the multiplicity, corresponding to five unpaired electrons with parallel spin in accordance with Hund's rule.

An atom can have a ground state with two incompletely filled subshells which are close in energy. The lightest example is the chromium (Cr) atom with a 3d^{5}4s electron configuration. Here there are six unpaired electrons all of parallel spin for a ^{7}S ground state.

== Molecules ==
Although most stable molecules have closed electron shells, a few have unpaired electrons for which Hund's rule is applicable. The most important example is the dioxygen molecule, O_{2}, which has two degenerate pi antibonding molecular orbitals (π*) occupied by only two electrons. In accordance with Hund's rule, the ground state is triplet oxygen with two unpaired electrons in singly occupied orbitals. The singlet oxygen state with one doubly occupied and one empty π* is an excited state with different chemical properties and greater reactivity than the ground state.

The valence orbitals of the oxygen atom (sides of diagram) and the dioxygen molecule (middle) in the ground state. In both atom and molecule, the electrons in singly occupied orbitals have their spins parallel.

== Exceptions ==
- In 2004, researchers reported the synthesis of 5-dehydro-m-xylylene (DMX), the first organic molecule known to violate Hund's rule.
- Local non-Hund configurations have been assigned to 4d and 5d metals participating in metal-metal bonding that overcomes the local exchange interaction, such as in the FeMo-cofactor of nitrogenase and synthetic models thereof.

== See also ==
- Hund's rules (includes this plus 2 other rules)
- High spin metal complexes
