= Good quantum number =

In quantum mechanics, the eigenvalue $q$ of an observable $O$ is said to be a good quantum number if the observable $O$ is a constant of motion. In other words, the quantum number is good if the corresponding observable commutes with the Hamiltonian. If the system starts from the eigenstate with an eigenvalue $q$, it remains on that state as the system evolves in time, and the measurement of $O$ always yields the same eigenvalue $q$.

Good quantum numbers are often used to label initial and final states in experiments. For example, in particle colliders:

1. Particles are initially prepared in approximate momentum eigenstates; the particle momentum being a good quantum number for non-interacting particles.
2. The particles are made to collide. At this point, the momentum of each particle is undergoing change and thus the particles’ momenta are not a good quantum number for the interacting particles during the collision.
3. A significant time after the collision, particles are measured in momentum eigenstates. Momentum of each particle has stabilized and is again a good quantum number a long time after the collision.

== Conservation of good quantum numbers ==
An operator, $O$, which commutes with the Hamiltonian, $H$, will share its eigenstates. A measurement of the system in one of these common eigenstates will definitely yield an eigenvalue of $O$. That value is a good quantum number. An eigenstate of the Hamiltonian is a stationary state, which means that even if the system is left to evolve for some time before the measurement is made, it will still yield the same eigenvalue.

== States which can be labelled by good quantum numbers ==
States which can be labelled by good quantum numbers are eigenstates of the Hamiltonian. They are also called stationary states. They are so called because the system remains in the same state as time elapses, in every observable way.

Such a state satisfies:

$$\hat H |\Psi\rangle=E_{\Psi} |\Psi\rangle$$,

where $|\Psi\rangle$ is a quantum state, $\hat H$ is the Hamiltonian operator, and $E_{\Psi}$ is the energy eigenvalue of the state $|\Psi\rangle$.

The evolution of the state ket is governed by the Schrödinger equation:

$$i\hbar\frac{\partial}{\partial t} |\Psi\rangle = E_{\Psi}|\Psi\rangle$$

It gives the time evolution of the state of the system as:

$$|\Psi(t)\rangle = e^{-iE_{\Psi}t/\hbar}|\Psi(0)\rangle$$

The time evolution only involves a steady change of a complex phase factor, which can't be observed. The state itself remains the same.

== Hydrogen atom ==
=== The hydrogen atom: no spin-orbit coupling ===
In the case of the hydrogen atom (with the assumption that there is no spin-orbit coupling), the observables that commute with Hamiltonian are the orbital angular momentum, spin angular momentum, the sum of the spin angular momentum and orbital angular momentum, and the $z$ components of the above angular momenta. Thus, the good quantum numbers in this case, (which are the eigenvalues of these observables) are $l, j, m_\text{l} , m_s, m_j$. We have omitted $s$, since it always is constant for an electron and carries no significance as far the labeling of states is concerned.

However, all the good quantum numbers in the above case of the hydrogen atom (with negligible spin-orbit coupling), namely $l, j, m_\text{l} , m_s, m_j$ can't be used simultaneously to specify a state. Here is when CSCO (Complete set of commuting observables) comes into play. Here are some general results which are of general validity :

1. A certain number of good quantum numbers can be used to specify uniquely a certain quantum state only when the observables corresponding to the good quantum numbers form a CSCO.
2. If the observables commute, but don't form a CSCO, then their good quantum numbers refer to a set of states. In this case they don't refer to a state uniquely.
3. If the observables don't commute they can't even be used to refer to any set of states, let alone refer to any unique state.

In the case of hydrogen atom, the $L^2, J^2 , L_z , J_z$ don't form a commuting set. But $n, l, m_\text{l}, m_s$ are the quantum numbers of a CSCO. So, are in this case, they form a set of good quantum numbers. Similarly, $n, l, j, m_\text{j}$ too form a set of good quantum numbers.

=== The hydrogen atom: spin-orbit interaction included ===
To take the spin-orbit interaction into account, we have to add an extra term in Hamiltonian

$$\Delta H_\text{SO} =\frac{\alpha}{r^3}\,\boldsymbol{S}\cdot\boldsymbol{L}$$,

where the prefactor $\alpha$ determines the strength of the spin-orbit coupling. Now, the new Hamiltonian with this new $\Delta H_\text{SO}$ term does not commute with $\boldsymbol{L}$ and $\boldsymbol{S}$. It only commutes with $L^2$, $S^2$, $J^2$ and $\boldsymbol{J}=\boldsymbol{L}+\boldsymbol{S}$ , which is the total angular momentum operator. In other words, $m_\text{l}, m_s$ are no longer good quantum numbers, but $l, s, j , m_\text{j}$ are (in addition to the principal quantum number $n$).

And since, good quantum numbers are used to label the eigenstates, the relevant formulae of interest are expressed in terms of them. For example, the expectation value of the spin-orbit interaction energy is given by

$$\langle n,l,s,j,m_j |\Delta H_\text{SO}| n,l,s,j,m_j\rangle = {\beta\over 2}(j(j+1) - l(l+1) -s(s+1))$$

where

$$\beta = \beta (n,l) = Z^4{\mu_0\over 4{\pi}^4}g_\text{s}\mu_\text{B}^2{1\over n^3a_0^3l(l+1/2)(l+1)}$$

The above expressions contain the good quantum numbers characterizing the eigenstate.

== See also ==
- Ehrenfest theorem
