= Spin quantum number =

Quantum number parameterizing spin and angular momentum

In chemistry and quantum mechanics, the spin quantum number is a quantum number (designated s) that describes the intrinsic angular momentum (or spin angular momentum, or simply spin) of an electron or other particle. It has the same value for all particles of the same type, such as s = 1/2 for all electrons. It is an integer for all bosons, such as photons, and a half-odd-integer for all fermions, such as electrons and protons.

The component of the spin along a specified axis is given by the spin magnetic quantum number, conventionally written m_{s}. The value of m_{s} is the component of spin angular momentum, in units of the reduced Planck constant ħ, parallel to a given direction (conventionally labelled the z–axis). It can take values ranging from +s to −s in integer increments. For an electron, m_{s} can be either + 1/2 or − 1/2 .

== Nomenclature ==
Quantum projection of S onto z for spin half particles

The phrase spin quantum number refers to quantized spin angular momentum. The symbol s is used for the spin quantum number, and m_{s} is described as the spin magnetic quantum number or as the z-component of spin s_{z}.

Both the total spin and the z-component of spin are quantized, leading to two quantum numbers spin and spin magnet quantum numbers. The (total) spin quantum number has only one value for every elementary particle. Some introductory chemistry textbooks describe m_{s} as the spin quantum number, and s is not mentioned since its value 1/2 is a fixed property of the electron; some even use the variable s in place of m_{s}.

The two spin quantum numbers $s$ and $m_s$ are the spin angular momentum analogs of the two orbital angular momentum quantum numbers $l$ and $m_l$.

Spin quantum numbers apply also to systems of coupled spins, such as atoms that may contain more than one electron. Capitalized symbols are used: S for the total electronic spin, and m_{S} or M_{S} for the z-axis component. A pair of electrons in a spin singlet state has S = 0, and a pair in the triplet state has S = 1, with m_{S} = −1, 0, or +1. Nuclear-spin quantum numbers are conventionally written I for spin, and m_{I} or M_{I} for the z-axis component.

== History ==
During the period between 1916 and 1925, much progress was being made concerning the arrangement of electrons in the periodic table. In order to explain the Zeeman effect in the Bohr model of the atom, Arnold Sommerfeld proposed that electrons would be based on three 'quantum numbers', n, k, and m, that described the size of the orbit, the shape of the orbit, and the direction in which the orbit was pointing. Irving Langmuir had explained in his 1919 paper regarding electrons in their shells, "Rydberg has pointed out that these numbers are obtained from the series $N = 2(1 + 2^2 + 2^2 + 3^2 + 3^2 + 4^2)$. The factor two suggests a fundamental two-fold symmetry for all stable atoms." This $2n^2$ configuration was adopted by Edmund Stoner, in October 1924 in his paper 'The Distribution of Electrons Among Atomic Levels' published in the Philosophical Magazine.

The qualitative success of the Sommerfeld quantum number scheme failed to explain the Zeeman effect in weak magnetic field strengths, the anomalous Zeeman effect. In December 1924, Wolfgang Pauli showed that the core electron angular momentum was not related to the effect as had previously been assumed. Rather he proposed that only the outer "light" electrons determined the angular momentum and he hypothesized that this required a fourth quantum number with a two-valuedness. This fourth quantum number became the spin magnetic quantum number.

=== Name ===
The name "spin" comes from a geometrical spinning of the electron about an axis, as proposed by George Uhlenbeck and Samuel Goudsmit. However, this simplistic picture was quickly realized to be physically unrealistic, because it would require the electrons to rotate faster than the speed of light. It was therefore replaced by a more abstract quantum-mechanical description.

=== Detection of spin ===
When lines of the hydrogen spectrum are examined at very high resolution, they are found to be closely spaced doublets. This splitting is called fine structure, and was one of the first experimental evidences for electron spin. The direct observation of the electron's intrinsic angular momentum was achieved in the Stern–Gerlach experiment.

==== Stern–Gerlach experiment ====
The theory of spatial quantization of the spin moment of the momentum of electrons of atoms situated in the magnetic field needed to be proved experimentally. In 1922 (two years before the theoretical description of the spin was created) Otto Stern and Walter Gerlach observed it in the experiment they conducted.

Silver atoms were evaporated using an electric furnace in a vacuum. Using thin slits, the atoms were guided into a flat beam and the beam sent through an inhomogeneous magnetic field before colliding with a metallic plate. The laws of classical physics predict that the collection of condensed silver atoms on the plate should form a thin solid line in the same shape as the original beam. However, the in-homogeneous magnetic field caused the beam to split in two separate directions, creating two lines on the metallic plate.

The phenomenon can be explained with the spatial quantization of the spin moment of momentum. In atoms the electrons are paired such that one spins upward and one downward, neutralizing the effect of their spin on the action of the atom as a whole. But in the valence shell of silver atoms, there is a single electron whose spin remains unbalanced.

The unbalanced spin creates spin magnetic moment, making the electron act like a very small magnet. As the atoms pass through the in-homogeneous magnetic field, the force moment in the magnetic field influences the electron's dipole until its position matches the direction of the stronger field. The atom would then be pulled toward or away from the stronger magnetic field a specific amount, depending on the value of the valence electron's spin. When the spin of the electron is + 1 /2 the atom moves away from the stronger field, and when the spin is − 1 /2 the atom moves toward it. Thus the beam of silver atoms is split while traveling through the in-homogeneous magnetic field, according to the spin of each atom's valence electron.

In 1927, Thomas Erwin Phipps and John Bellamy Taylor conducted a similar experiment, using atoms of hydrogen with similar results. Later scientists conducted experiments using other atoms that have only one electron in their valence shell: (copper, gold, sodium, potassium). Every time there were two lines formed on the metallic plate.

The atomic nucleus also may have spin, but protons and neutrons are much heavier than electrons (about 1836 times), and the magnetic dipole moment is inversely proportional to the mass. So the nuclear magnetic dipole momentum is much smaller than that of the whole atom. This small magnetic dipole was later measured by Stern, Otto Frisch and Immanuel Estermann.

=== Energy levels from the Dirac equation ===
In 1928, Paul Dirac developed a relativistic wave equation, now termed the Dirac equation, which predicted the spin magnetic moment correctly, and at the same time treated the electron as a point-like particle. Solving the Dirac equation for the energy levels of an electron in the hydrogen atom, all four quantum numbers including s occurred naturally and agreed well with experiment.

== Electron spin ==
A spin- 1 /2 particle is characterized by an angular momentum quantum number for spin s = 1 /2. In solutions of the Schrödinger-Pauli equation, angular momentum is quantized according to this number, so that magnitude of the spin angular momentum is

$$\| \bold{S} \| = \hbar\sqrt{s(s+1)} = \tfrac{\sqrt{3}}{2}\ \hbar ~.$$

The hydrogen spectrum fine structure is observed as a doublet corresponding to two possibilities for the z-component of the angular momentum, where for any given direction z:
$$s_z = \pm \tfrac{1}{2}\hbar ~.$$

whose solution has only two possible z-components for the electron. In the electron, the two different spin orientations are sometimes called "spin-up" or "spin-down".

The spin property of an electron would give rise to magnetic moment, which was a requisite for the fourth quantum number.

The magnetic moment vector of an electron spin is given by:

$$\ \boldsymbol{\mu}_\text{s} = -\frac{e}{\ 2m\ }\ g_\text{s}\ \bold{S}\$$

where $-e$ is the electron charge, $m$ is the electron mass, and $g_\text{s}$ is the electron spin g-factor, which is approximately 2.0023. Its z-axis projection is given by the spin magnetic quantum number $m_\text{s}$ according to:

$$\mu_z = -m_\text{s}\ g_\text{s}\ \mu_\mathsf{B} = \pm \tfrac{1}{2}\ g_\text{s}\ \mu_\mathsf{B}\$$

where $\ \mu_\mathsf{B}\$ is the Bohr magneton.

When atoms have even numbers of electrons the spin of each electron in each orbital has opposing orientation to that of its immediate neighbor(s). However, many atoms have an odd number of electrons or an arrangement of electrons in which there is an unequal number of "spin-up" and "spin-down" orientations. These atoms or electrons are said to have unpaired spins that are detected in electron spin resonance.

== Nuclear spin ==
Atomic nuclei also have spins. The nuclear spin I is a fixed property of each nucleus and may be either an integer or a half-integer. The component m_{I} of nuclear spin parallel to the z-axis can have (2I + 1) values I, I−1, ..., −I. For example, a ^{14}N nucleus has I = 1, so that there are 3 possible orientations relative to the z-axis, corresponding to states m_{I} = +1, 0 and −1.

The spins I of different nuclei are interpreted using the nuclear shell model. Even-even nuclei with even numbers of both protons and neutrons, such as ^{12}C and ^{16}O, have spin zero. Odd mass number nuclei have half-integer spins, such as 3/ 2 for ^{7}Li, 1 /2 for ^{13}C and 5/ 2 for ^{17}O, usually corresponding to the angular momentum of the last nucleon added. Odd-odd nuclei with odd numbers of both protons and neutrons have integer spins, such as 3 for ^{10}B, and 1 for ^{14}N. Values of nuclear spin for a given isotope are found in the lists of isotopes for each element. (See isotopes of oxygen, isotopes of aluminium, etc. etc.)

== Electron paramagnetic resonance ==
For atoms or molecules with an unpaired electron, transitions in a magnetic field can also be observed in which only the spin quantum number changes, without change in the electron orbital or the other quantum numbers. This is the method of electron paramagnetic resonance (EPR) or electron spin resonance (ESR), used to study free radicals. Since only the magnetic interaction of the spin changes, the energy change is much smaller than for transitions between orbitals, and the spectra are observed in the microwave region.

== Relation to spin vectors ==
For a solution of either the nonrelativistic Pauli equation or the relativistic Dirac equation, the quantized angular momentum (see angular momentum quantum number) can be written as:
$$\Vert \mathbf{s} \Vert = \sqrt{s \, (s+1)\,} \, \hbar$$
where

- $\mathbf{s}$ is the quantized spin vector or spinor
- $\Vert \mathbf{s}\Vert$ is the norm of the spin vector
- s is the spin quantum number associated with the spin angular momentum
- $\hbar$ is the reduced Planck constant.

Given an arbitrary direction z (usually determined by an external magnetic field) the spin z-projection is given by

$$s_z = m_s \, \hbar$$

where m_{s} is the magnetic spin quantum number, ranging from −s to +s in steps of one. This generates 2 s + 1 different values of m_{s}.

The allowed values for s are non-negative integers or half-integers. Fermions have half-integer values, including the electron, proton and neutron which all have s = + 1 /2 . Bosons such as the photon and all mesons) have integer spin values.

== Algebra ==
The algebraic theory of spin is a carbon copy of the angular momentum in quantum mechanics theory. First of all, spin satisfies the fundamental commutation relation:
$$\ [S_i, S_j ] = i\ \hbar\ \epsilon_{ijk}\ S_k\ ,$$
$$\ \left[S_i, S^2 \right] = 0\$$
where $\ \epsilon_{ijk}\$ is the (antisymmetric) Levi-Civita symbol. This means that it is impossible to know two coordinates of the spin at the same time because of the restriction of the uncertainty principle.

Next, the eigenvectors of $\ S^2\$ and $\ S_z\$ satisfy:
$$\ S^2\ | s, m_s \rangle= {\hbar}^2\ s(s+1)\ | s, m_s \rangle\$$
$$\ S_z\ | s, m_s \rangle = \hbar\ m_s\ | s, m_s \rangle\$$
$$\ S_\pm\ | s, m_s \rangle = \hbar\ \sqrt{s(s+1) - m_s(m_s \pm 1)\ }\; | s, m_s \pm 1 \rangle\$$
where $\ S_\pm = S_x \pm i S_y\$ are the ladder (or "raising" and "lowering") operators.

== Total spin of an atom or molecule ==
For some atoms the spins of several unpaired electrons (s_{1}, s_{2}, ...) are coupled to form a total spin quantum number S. This occurs especially in light atoms (or in molecules formed only of light atoms) when spin–orbit coupling is weak compared to the coupling between spins or the coupling between orbital angular momenta, a situation known as L S coupling because L and S are constants of motion. Here L is the total orbital angular momentum quantum number.

For atoms with a well-defined S, the multiplicity of a state is defined as 2S + 1. This is equal to the number of different possible values of the total (orbital plus spin) angular momentum J for a given (L, S) combination, provided that S ≤ L (the typical case). For example, if S = 1, there are three states which form a triplet. The eigenvalues of S_{z} for these three states are +1ħ, 0, and −1ħ. The term symbol of an atomic state indicates its values of L, S, and J.

As examples, the ground states of both the oxygen atom and the dioxygen molecule have two unpaired electrons and are therefore triplet states. The atomic state is described by the term symbol ^{3}P, and the molecular state by the term symbol ^{3}Σ^{−}_{g} where the superscript "3" indicates the multiplicity.

== See also ==
- Basic quantum mechanics
- Rotational spectroscopy
- Total angular momentum quantum number
