= Azimuthal quantum number =

Quantum number denoting orbital angular momentum

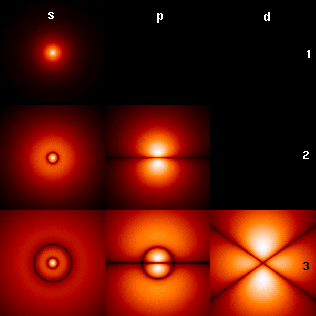
The atomic orbital wavefunctions of a hydrogen atom: The azimuthal quantum number (ℓ) is denoted by letter at the top of each column. The principal quantum number (n) is shown at the right of each row.

In quantum mechanics, the azimuthal quantum number ℓ is a quantum number for an atomic orbital that determines its orbital angular momentum and describes aspects of the angular shape of the orbital. The azimuthal quantum number is the second of a set of quantum numbers that describe the unique quantum state of an electron (the others being the principal quantum number n, the magnetic quantum number m_{ℓ}, and the spin quantum number m_{s}).

For a given value of the principal quantum number n (electron shell), the possible values of ℓ are the integers from 0 to n − 1. For instance, the n = 1 shell has only orbitals with $\ell=0$, and the n = 2 shell has only orbitals with $\ell=0$, and $\ell=1$.

For a given value of the azimuthal quantum number ℓ, the possible values of the magnetic quantum number m_{ℓ} are the integers from m_{ℓ}=−ℓ to m_{ℓ}=+ℓ, including 0. In addition, the spin quantum number m_{s} can take two distinct values. The set of orbitals associated with a particular value of ℓ are sometimes collectively called a subshell.

While originally used just for isolated atoms, atomic-like orbitals play a key role in the configuration of electrons in compounds including gases, liquids and solids. The quantum number ℓ plays an important role here via the connection to the angular dependence of the spherical harmonics for the different orbitals around each atom.

== Nomenclature ==
The term "azimuthal quantum number" was introduced by Arnold Sommerfeld in 1915 as part of an ad hoc description of the energy structure of atomic spectra. Only later with the quantum model of the atom was it understood that this number, ℓ, arises from quantization of orbital angular momentum. Some textbooks and the ISO standard 80000-10:2019 call ℓ the orbital angular momentum quantum number.

The energy levels of an atom in an external magnetic field depend upon the m_{ℓ} value so it is sometimes called the magnetic quantum number.

The lowercase letter ℓ, is used to denote the orbital angular momentum of a single particle. For a system with multiple particles, the capital letter L is used.

== Relation to atomic orbitals ==
Azimuthal quantum number: Illustrating (five) alternative orbital angular momentum shapes as "cones"—here portraying (five) alternative values in terms of the reduced Planck constant, ħ.

There are four quantum numbers—n, ℓ, m_{ℓ}, m_{s}— connected with the energy states of an isolated atom's electrons. These four numbers specify the unique and complete quantum state of any single electron in the atom, and they combine to compose the electron's wavefunction, or orbital.

When solving to obtain the wave function, the Schrödinger equation resolves into three equations that lead to the first three quantum numbers, meaning that the three equations are interrelated. The azimuthal quantum number arises in solving the polar part of the wave equation—relying on the spherical coordinate system, which generally works best with models having sufficient aspects of spherical symmetry.

An electron's angular momentum, L, is related to its quantum number ℓ by the following equation:

$$\mathbf{L}^2\Psi = \hbar^2 \ell(\ell + 1) \Psi,$$

where ħ is the reduced Planck constant, L is the orbital angular momentum operator and $\Psi$ is the wavefunction of the electron. The quantum number ℓ is always a non-negative integer: 0, 1, 2, 3, etc. (Notably, L has no real meaning except in its use as the angular momentum operator; thus, it is standard practice to use the quantum number ℓ when referring to angular momentum).

Atomic orbitals have distinctive shapes, (see top graphic) in which letters, s, p, d, f, etc., (employing a convention originating in spectroscopy) denote the shape of the atomic orbital. The wavefunctions of these orbitals take the form of spherical harmonics, and so are described by Legendre polynomials. The several orbitals relating to the different (integer) values of ℓ are sometimes called sub-shells—referred to by lowercase Latin letters chosen for historical reasons—as shown in the table "Quantum subshells for the azimuthal quantum number".

Quantum subshells for the azimuthal quantum number
Azimuthal quantum number (ℓ)	Historical letter	Historical name	Maximum electrons	Shape
0	s	sharp	2	Spherical (see this picture of spherical harmonics, top row).
1	p	principal	6	Three dumbbell-shaped polar-aligned orbitals; one lobe on each pole of the x, y, and z axes (on both + and − axes).
2	d	diffuse	10	Nine dumbbells and one doughnut, or "Unique shape #1" (see this picture of spherical harmonics, third row center).
3	f	fundamental	14	"Unique shape #2" (see this picture of spherical harmonics, bottom row center).
4	g		18	
5	h		22	
6	i		26	
The letters after the g sub-shell follow in alphabetical order—excepting letter j and those already used.

Each of the different angular momentum states can take 2(2ℓ + 1) electrons. This is because the third quantum number m_{ℓ} (which can be thought of loosely as the quantized projection of the angular momentum vector on the z-axis) runs from −ℓ to ℓ in integer units, and so there are 2ℓ + 1 possible states. Each distinct n, ℓ, m_{ℓ} orbital can be occupied by two electrons with opposing spins (given by the quantum number m_{s} = ±1/2), giving 2(2ℓ + 1) electrons overall. Orbitals with higher ℓ than given in the table are perfectly permissible, but these values cover all atoms so far discovered.

For a given value of the principal quantum number n, the possible values of ℓ range from 0 to n − 1; therefore, the n = 1 shell only possesses an s subshell and can only take 2 electrons, the n = 2 shell possesses an s and a p subshell and can take 8 electrons overall, the n = 3 shell possesses s, p, and d subshells and has a maximum of 18 electrons, and so on.

A simplistic one-electron model results in energy levels depending on the principal number alone. In more complex atoms these energy levels split for all n > 1, placing states of higher ℓ above states of lower ℓ. For example, the energy of 2p is higher than of 2s, 3d occurs higher than 3p, which in turn is above 3s, etc. This effect eventually forms the block structure of the periodic table. No known atom possesses an electron having ℓ higher than three (f) in its ground state.

The angular momentum quantum number, ℓ and the corresponding spherical harmonic govern the number of planar nodes going through the nucleus. A planar node can be described in an electromagnetic wave as the midpoint between crest and trough, which has zero magnitudes. In an s orbital, no nodes go through the nucleus, therefore the corresponding azimuthal quantum number ℓ takes the value of 0. In a p orbital, one node traverses the nucleus and therefore ℓ has the value of 1. $L$ has the value $\sqrt{2}\hbar$.

Depending on the value of n, there is an angular momentum quantum number ℓ and the following series. The wavelengths listed are for a hydrogen atom:

- $n = 1, L = 0$, Lyman series (ultraviolet)
- $n = 2, L = \sqrt{2}\hbar$, Balmer series (visible)
- $n = 3, L = \sqrt{6}\hbar$, Ritz–Paschen series (near infrared)
- $n = 4, L = 2\sqrt{3}\hbar$, Brackett series (short-wavelength infrared)
- $n = 5, L = 2\sqrt{5}\hbar$, Pfund series (mid-wavelength infrared).

== Addition of quantized angular momenta ==
Given a quantized total angular momentum $\mathbf{j}$ that is the sum of two individual quantized angular momenta $\boldsymbol{\ell}_1$ and $\boldsymbol{\ell}_2$,
$$\mathbf{j} = \boldsymbol{\ell}_1 + \boldsymbol{\ell}_2$$
the quantum number $j$ associated with its magnitude can range from $|\ell_1 - \ell_2|$ to $\ell_1 + \ell_2$ in integer steps where $\ell_1$ and $\ell_2$ are quantum numbers corresponding to the magnitudes of the individual angular momenta.

=== Total angular momentum of an electron in the atom ===
"Vector cones" of total angular momentum J (purple), orbital L (blue), and spin S (green). The cones arise due to quantum uncertainty between measuring angular momentum component.

Due to the spin–orbit interaction in an atom, the orbital angular momentum no longer commutes with the Hamiltonian, nor does the spin. These therefore change over time. However the total angular momentum J does commute with the one-electron Hamiltonian and so is constant. J is defined as
$$\mathbf{J} = \mathbf{L} + \mathbf{S}$$
L being the orbital angular momentum and S the spin. The total angular momentum satisfies the same commutation relations as orbital angular momentum, namely
$$[J_i, J_j ] = i \hbar \varepsilon_{ijk} J_k$$
from which it follows that
$$\left[J_i, J^2 \right] = 0$$
where J_{i} stand for J_{x}, J_{y}, and J_{z}.

The quantum numbers describing the system, which are constant over time, are now j and m_{j}, defined through the action of J on the wavefunction $\Psi$
$$\begin{align}
\mathbf{J}^2\Psi &= \hbar^2 j(j+1) \Psi \\[1ex]
\mathbf{J}_z\Psi &= \hbar m_j\Psi
\end{align}$$

So that j is related to the norm of the total angular momentum and m_{j} to its projection along a specified axis. The j number has a particular importance for relativistic quantum chemistry, often featuring in subscript in for deeper states near to the core for which spin-orbit coupling is important.

As with any angular momentum in quantum mechanics, the projection of J along other axes cannot be co-defined with J_{z}, because they do not commute. The eigenvectors of j, s, m_{j} and parity, which are also eigenvectors of the Hamiltonian, are linear combinations of the eigenvectors of ℓ, s, m_{ℓ} and m_{s}.

== Beyond isolated atoms ==
Example of inner shell ionization edge (core loss) EELS data from La_{0.7}Sr_{0.3}MnO_{3}, acquired in a scanning transmission electron microscope.

The angular momentum quantum numbers strictly refer to isolated atoms. However, they have wider uses for atoms in solids, liquids or gases. The ℓ m quantum number corresponds to specific spherical harmonics and are commonly used to describe features observed in spectroscopic methods such as X-ray photoelectron spectroscopy and electron energy loss spectroscopy. (The notation is slightly different, with X-ray notation where K, L, M are used for excitations out of electron states with $n=0, 1, 2$.)

The angular momentum quantum numbers are also used when the electron states are described in methods such as Kohn–Sham density functional theory or with gaussian orbitals. For instance, in silicon the electronic properties used in semiconductor device are due to the p-like states with $l=1$ centered at each atom, while many properties of transition metals depend upon the d-like states with $l=2$.

== History ==
The azimuthal quantum number was carried over from the Bohr model of the atom, and was posited by Arnold Sommerfeld. The Bohr model was derived from spectroscopic analysis of atoms in combination with the Rutherford atomic model. The lowest quantum level was found to have an angular momentum of zero. Orbits with zero angular momentum were considered as oscillating charges in one dimension and so described as "pendulum" orbits, but were not found in nature. In three-dimensions the orbits become spherical without any nodes crossing the nucleus, similar (in the lowest-energy state) to a skipping rope that oscillates in one large circle.

== See also ==
- Introduction to quantum mechanics
- Particle in a spherically symmetric potential
- Angular momentum coupling
- Angular momentum operator
- Clebsch–Gordan coefficients
