= Phosphorescence =

Light energy absorbance and re-emission

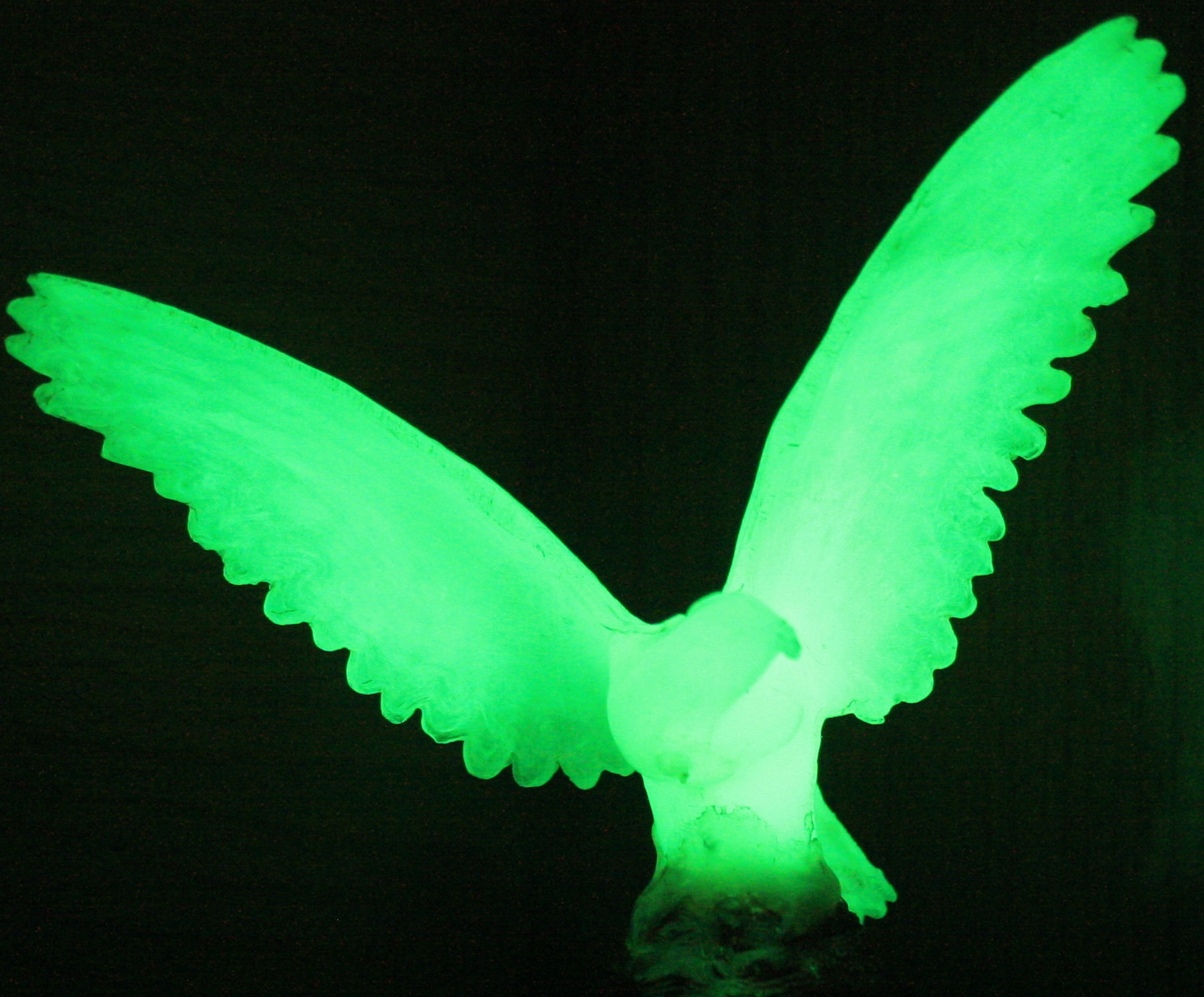
Phosphorescent bird figure

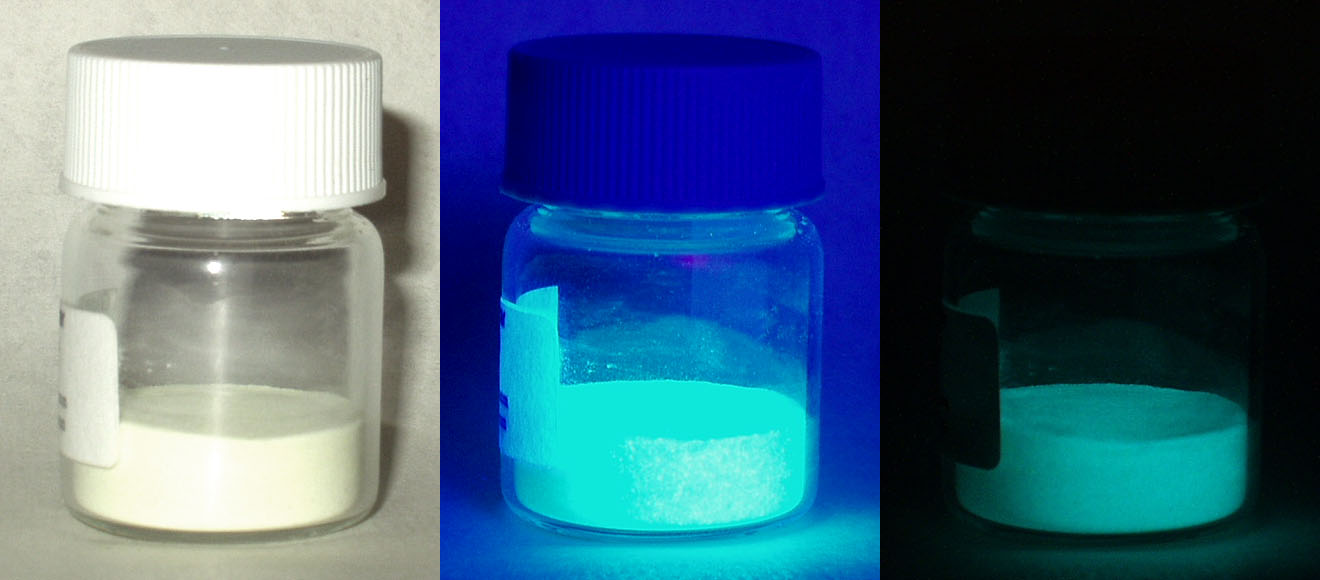
Phosphorescent, europium-doped, strontium silicate-aluminate oxide powder under visible light, fluorescing/phosphorescing under long-wave UV light, and persistently phosphorescing in total darkness

Phosphorescence is a type of photoluminescence related to fluorescence. When exposed to light (radiation) of a shorter threshold wavelength, a phosphorescent substance will glow, absorbing the light and reemitting it at a longer wavelength. Unlike fluorescence, a phosphorescent material does not immediately reemit the radiation it absorbs. Instead, a phosphorescent material absorbs some of the radiation energy and reemits it for a much longer time after the radiation source is removed.

There is no distinct boundary between the emission times of fluorescence and phosphorescence (i.e. if a substance glows under a black light it is generally considered fluorescent, and if it glows in the dark it is often simply called phosphorescent). The phenomena can usually be classified by the three different mechanisms that produce the light and the typical timescales at which they emit light: fluorescence, triplet phosphorescence, and persistent phosphorescence. Fluorescent materials stop emitting light within nanoseconds (billionths of a second) after the excitation radiation is removed, while phosphorescent materials may continue to emit an afterglow ranging from a few microseconds to many hours after the excitation is removed.

There are two separate mechanisms that may produce phosphorescence, called triplet phosphorescence (or simply phosphorescence) and persistent phosphorescence (or persistent luminescence):

- Triplet phosphorescence occurs when an atom absorbs a high-energy photon, and the energy becomes locked in the spin multiplicity of the electrons, generally changing from a fluorescent singlet state to a slower emitting triplet state. The slower timescales of the reemission are associated with "forbidden" energy state transitions in quantum mechanics. As these transitions occur relatively slowly in certain materials, absorbed radiation is reemitted at a lower intensity, ranging from a few microseconds to as much as one second after the excitation is removed.
- Persistent phosphorescence occurs when an atom absorbs a high-energy photon and an electron becomes trapped in a defect in the lattice of the crystalline or amorphous material. A defect such as a missing atom (vacancy defect) can trap an electron like a pitfall, storing that electron's energy until released by a random spike of thermal (vibrational) energy. Such a substance will then emit light of gradually decreasing intensity, ranging from a few seconds to up to several hours after the original excitation.

Everyday phosphorescent materials include glow-in-the-dark toys, stickers, paint, and clock dials that glow after being charged with a bright light such as in any normal reading or room light. Once the light source is turned off the glow slowly fades out, sometimes within a few minutes or sometimes up to a few hours.

The study of phosphorescent materials led to the discovery of radioactive decay. Uranium salts are phosphorescent and fog photographic plates sensitive to x-rays. For years it was thought that phosphorescence was the cause of the fogging. In 1896 Henri Becquerel left uranium salts in a closed drawer with photographic plates and later discovered the plates had fogged without a light source to excite the salts. Becquerel's discovery that the uranium salts emitted radiation inspired the work of Marie Curie and yielded both a Nobel Prize in 1903.

== Etymology ==
The term phosphorescence comes from the Ancient Greek word φῶς (phos), meaning "light", and the Greek suffix -φόρος (-phoros), meaning "to bear", combined with the Latin suffix -escentem, meaning "beginning, becoming, tending to be". Thus, phosphorescence literally means "having a tendency to bear light". It was first recorded in 1766.

The term phosphor had been used since the Middle Ages to describe minerals that glowed in the dark. One of the most famous, was Bolognian phosphor, or lapis solaris, discovered around 1604 by Vincenzo Casciarolo near Bologna, Italy. After being heated in an oxygen-rich furnace, it absorbed sunlight and glowed in the dark. In 1677, Hennig Brand isolated a new element that glowed due to a chemiluminescent reaction when exposed to air, and named it "phosphorus".

The term luminescence (from the Latin lumen for "light"), was coined by Eilhardt Wiedemann in 1888 as a term to refer to "light without heat", while Sir George Stokes coined florescence in 1852, when he noticed that a solution of quinine sulfate exposed to light refracted through a prism glowed when exposed to invisible-light (now known to be UV light) beyond the violet end of the spectrum. Stokes formed the term from a combination of fluorspar and opalescence (preferring to use a mineral instead of a solution). It was later discovered that fluorspar glows due to phosphorescence.

There was much confusion between the meanings of these terms throughout the late nineteenth to mid-twentieth centuries. Florescence mostly referred to luminescence that, to the eye, ceased immediately when removed from excitation. Phosphorescence referred to most substances that glowed in darkness, sometimes including chemiluminescence. After the 1950s and 1960s, advances in quantum electronics, spectroscopy, and lasers made it possible to distinguish processes, although colloquially the terms are often used interchangeably.

== Introduction ==
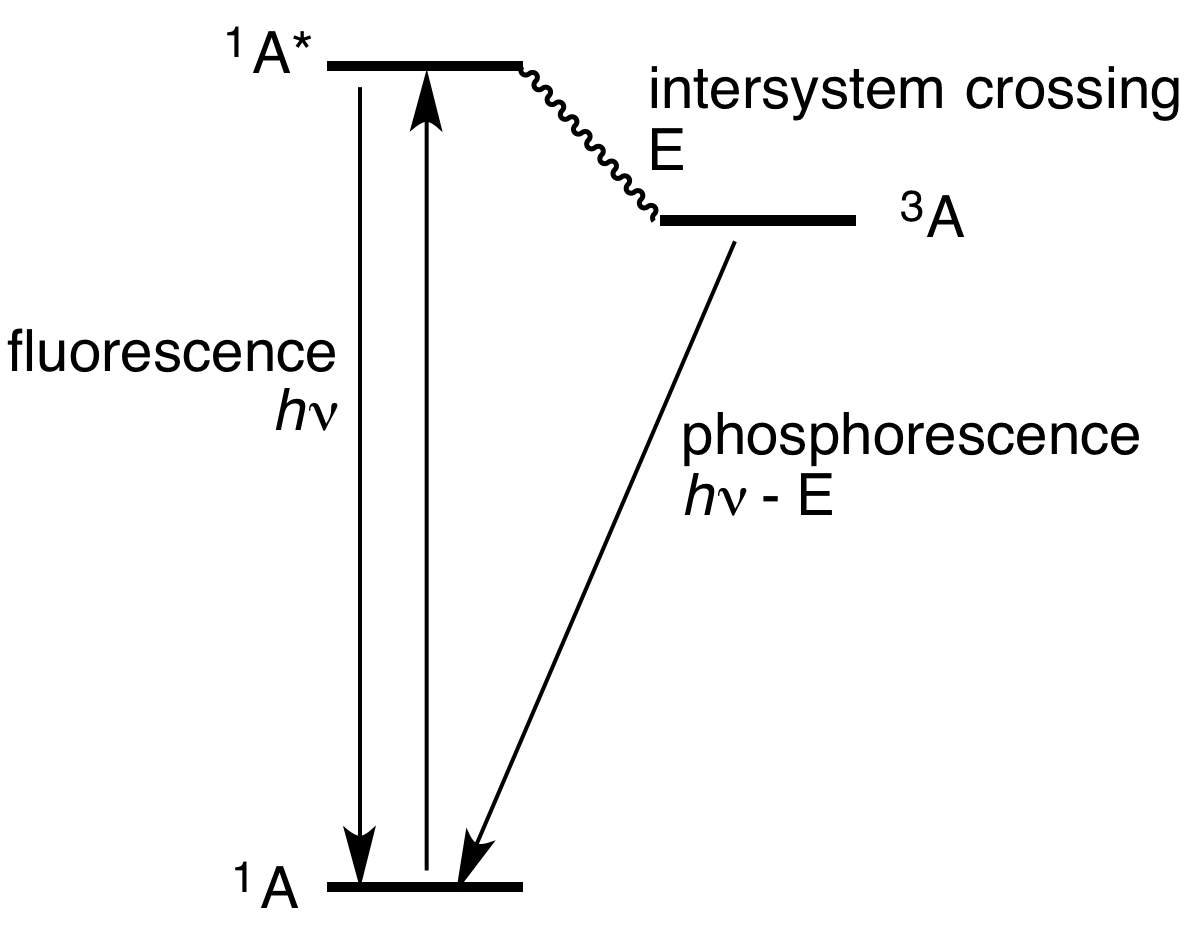
Jablonski diagram of an energy scheme used to explain the difference between fluorescence and phosphorescence. The excitation of molecule A to its singlet excited state (^{1}A*) may, after a short time between absorption and emission (fluorescence lifetime), return immediately to ground state, giving off a photon via fluorescence (decay time). However, sustained excitation is followed by intersystem crossing to the triplet state (^{3}A) that relaxes to the ground state by phosphorescence with much longer decay times.

Phosphorescence is a process where energy absorbed by a substance is released relatively slowly as light. This is often the mechanism used in glow-in-the-dark materials which are "charged" by exposure to light. Unlike the swift reactions in fluorescence, such as in laser mediums like ruby, phosphorescent materials "store" absorbed energy for a longer time, as the atoms need more specific conditions to re-emit the energy. Timescale is only a general distinction, as there are slow-emitting fluorescent materials such as uranyl salts, and some quickly-emitting phosphorescent materials like zinc sulfide in violet light. The phenomena are classified by the mechanisms that produce the light. Materials that phosphoresce may be suitable for some purposes such as lighting, but may be completely unsuitable for others that require fluorescence, like lasers. Further blurring the lines, a substance may emit light by a combination of the mechanisms, depending on the excitation conditions.

When the stored energy becomes locked in by the spin of the atomic electrons, a triplet state can occur, slowing the emission of light, sometimes by several orders of magnitude. Because the atoms usually begin in a singlet state of spin, favoring fluorescence, these phosphors typically produce both types of emission during illumination, and then a dimmer afterglow of phosphorescent light for less than a second after illumination.

Conversely, when the stored energy is due to persistent phosphorescence, an entirely different process occurs without a fluorescence precursor. When electrons become trapped within a defect in the atomic or molecular lattice, light is prevented from reemitting until the electron can escape. To escape, the electron needs a boost of thermal energy to help spring it out of the trap and back into orbit around the atom. Only then can the atom emit a photon. Thus, persistent phosphorescence is highly dependent on the temperature of the material.

== Triplet phosphorescence ==
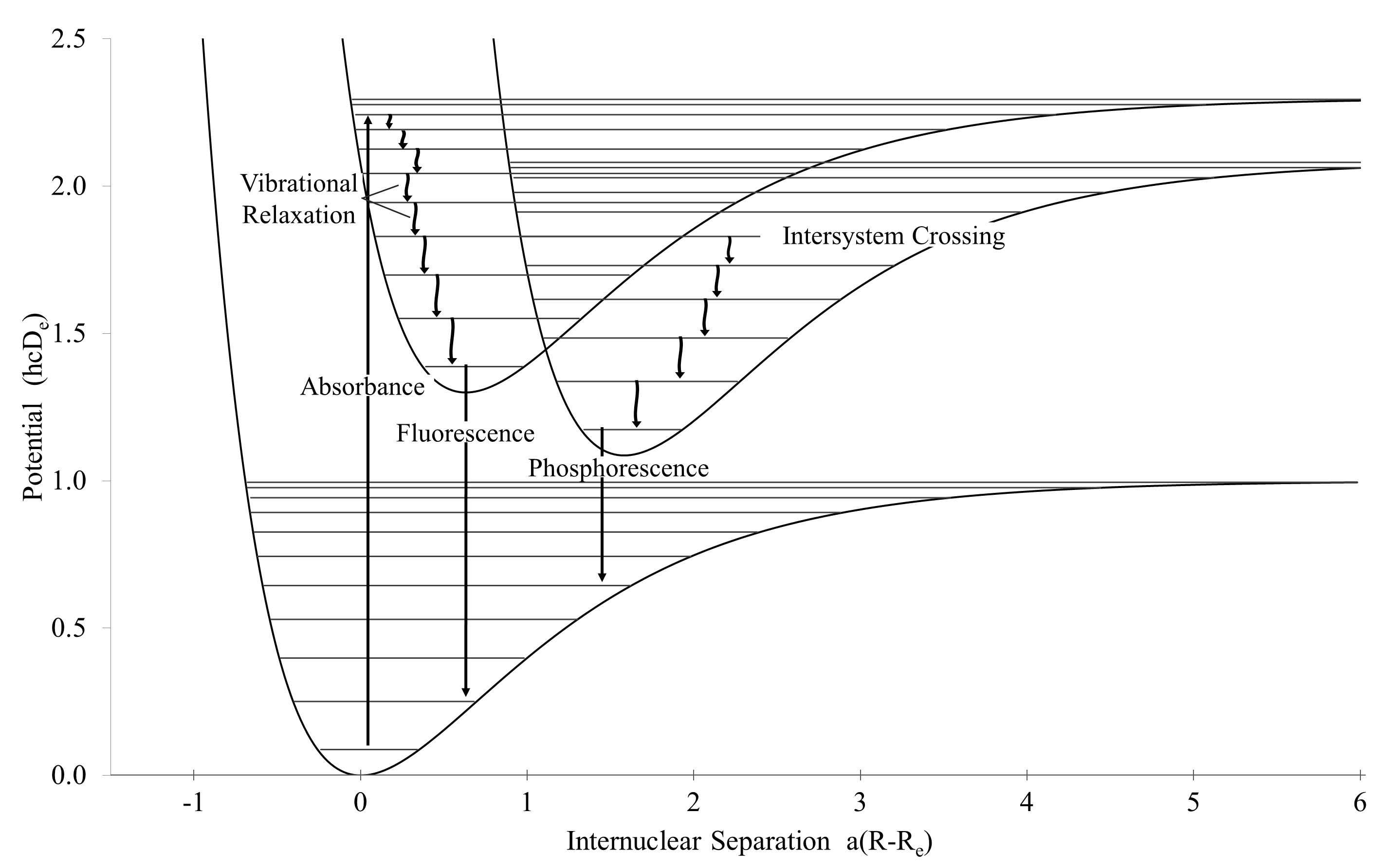
After an electron absorbs a photon of high energy, it may undergo vibrational relaxations and intersystem crossing to another spin state. Again the system relaxes vibrationally in the new spin state and eventually emits light by phosphorescence.

Most photoluminescent events, in which a chemical substrate absorbs and then re-emits a photon of light, are fast, in the order of 10 nanoseconds. Light is absorbed and emitted at these fast time scales where the energy of the photons involved matches the available energy states and allowed transitions of the substrate. In the special case of phosphorescence, the electron which absorbed the photon (energy) undergoes an unusual intersystem crossing into an energy state of different (usually higher) spin multiplicity (see term symbol), usually a triplet state. As a result, the excited electron can become trapped in the triplet state with only "forbidden" transitions available to return to the lower energy singlet state. These transitions, although "forbidden", will still occur in quantum mechanics but are kinetically unfavored and thus progress at significantly slower time scales. Most phosphorescent compounds are still relatively fast emitters, with triplet decay-times in the order of milliseconds.

Common examples include the phosphor coatings used in fluorescent lamps, where phosphorescence on the order of milliseconds or longer is useful for filling in the "off-time" between alternating current cycles, helping to reduce "flicker". Phosphors with faster decay times are used in applications like the pixels excited by free electrons (cathodoluminescence) in cathode-ray tube television-sets, which are slow enough to allow the formation of a picture as the electron beam scans the screen, but fast enough to prevent the frames from blurring together. Even substances commonly associated with fluorescence may in fact be prone to phosphorescence, such as the liquid dyes found in highlighter pens, which is a common problem in liquid dye lasers. The onset of phosphorescence in this case can sometimes be reduced or delayed significantly by the use of triplet-quenching agents.

=== Equation ===
$$S_0 + h\nu \to S_1 \to T_1 \to S_0 + h\nu^\prime\$$
where S is a singlet and T a triplet whose subscripts denote states (0 is the ground state, and 1 the excited state). Transitions can also occur to higher energy levels, but the first excited state is denoted for simplicity.

== Persistent phosphorescence ==
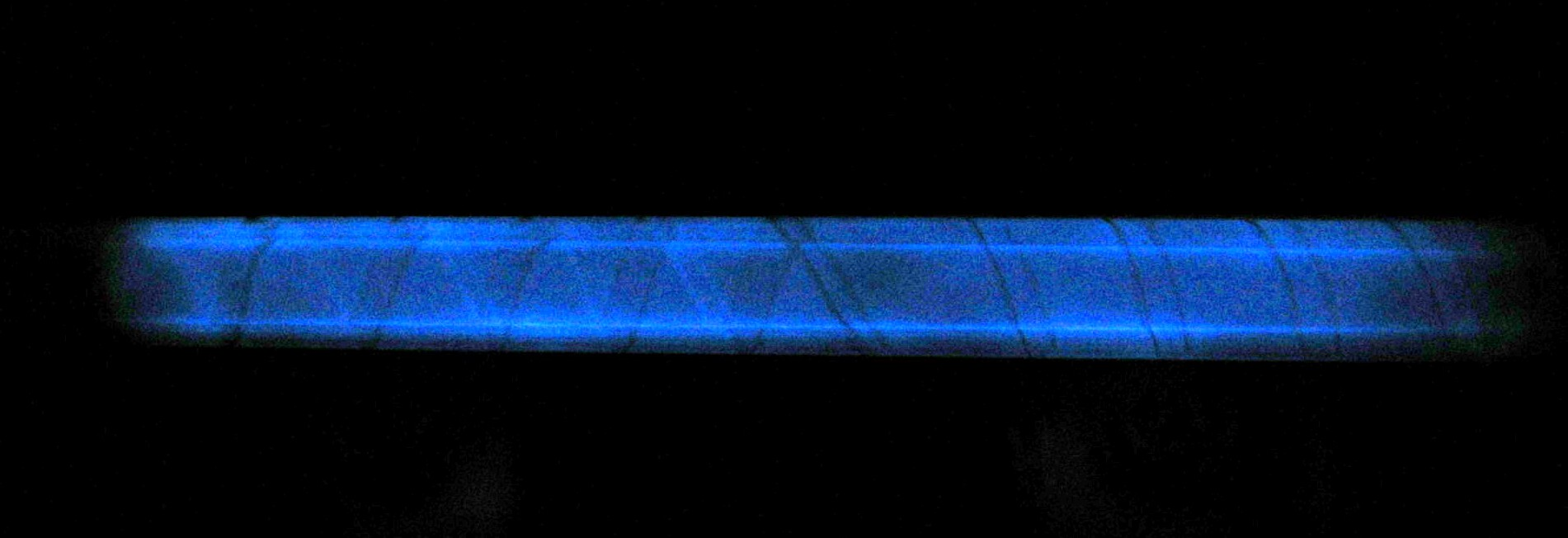
An extremely intense pulse of short-wave UV light in a flashtube produced this blue persistent-phosphorescence in the amorphous, fused silica envelope, lasting as long as 20 minutes after the 3.5 microsecond flash.

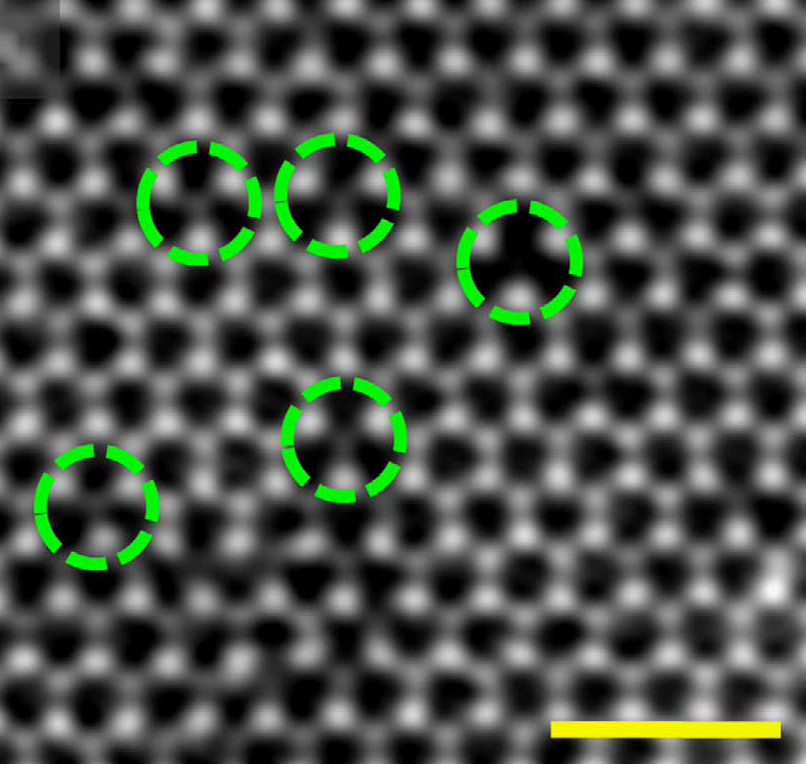
An electron microscope reveals vacancy defects in a crystalline lattice of molybdenum disulfide. The missing sulfur atoms leave dangling bonds between the molybdenum atoms, creating traps in the empty spaces.

Most solid materials are crystalline or amorphous. In either case, a lattice or network of atoms and molecules form. In crystals, the lattice is a very neat, uniform assembly. However, nearly all crystals have defects in the stacking sequence of these molecules and atoms. A vacancy defect, where an atom is simply missing from its place, leaving an empty "hole", is one type of defect. Sometimes atoms can move from place to place within the lattice, creating Schottky defects or Frenkel defects. Other defects can occur from impurities in the lattice. For example, when a normal atom is substituted by a different atom of much larger or smaller size, a substitutional defect occurs, while an interstitial defect occurs when a much smaller atom gets trapped in the "interstices", or the spaces between atoms. In contrast, amorphous materials have no "long-range order" (beyond the space of a few atoms in any direction), thus by definition are filled with defects.

When a defect occurs it can create a hole, or a "trap". For example, a missing oxygen atom from a zinc oxide compound creates a hole in the lattice, surrounded by unbound zinc-atoms. This creates a net force that can trap charged particles. When a high-energy photon strikes one of the zinc atoms, its electron absorbs the photon and is thrown out into a higher orbit. The electron may then enter the trap and be held in place (out of its normal orbit) by the attraction. To trigger the release of the energy, a random spike in thermal energy of sufficient magnitude is needed to boost the electron out of the trap and back into its normal orbit. Once in orbit, the electron's energy can drop back to normal (ground state) resulting in the release of a photon.

The release of energy in this way is a completely random process, governed mostly by the average temperature of the material versus the "depth" of the trap, or how many electron-volts of energy are needed to escape. A trap that has a depth of 2.0 electron-volts would require a great amount of thermal energy (very high temperature) to overcome the attraction, while at a depth of 0.1 electron-volts a very low temperature is needed for the trap to hold an electron. Generally, higher temperatures cause a faster release of energy, resulting in a brighter and short-lived emission, while lower temperatures produce a dimmer, longer-lasting glow. Materials have different temperature ranges that allow persistent phosphorescence.

Persistent phosphorescence is the mechanism of many glow-in-the-dark materials. The ideal depth of trap for persistent phosphorescence at room temperature is typically between 0.6 and 0.7 electron-volts. One metric for qualifying persistent phosphorescence is the phosphorescent quantum yield of a material, which is the fraction of excited electrons which fall into the traps. If the phosphorescence quantum yield of a material is high, this substance will retain a significant amount of the absorbed energy and slowly release it over a long time as a dim glow.

== Chemiluminescence ==
Some examples of glow-in-the-dark materials do not glow by phosphorescence. For example, glow sticks glow due to a chemiluminescent process which is commonly mistaken for phosphorescence. In chemiluminescence, an excited state is created via a chemical reaction. The light emission tracks the kinetic progress of the underlying chemical reaction. The excited state will then transfer to a dye molecule, also known as a sensitizer or fluorophor, and subsequently fluoresce back to the ground state.

== Materials ==
Common phosphorescent pigments include zinc sulfide and strontium aluminate. Use of zinc sulfide for safety-related products dates back to the 1930s.

Strontium aluminate pigments were developed in 1993 as a substitute for glow-in-the-dark materials with high luminance and long phosphorescence, especially those that used promethium, which is radioactive. Yasumitsu Aoki (Nemoto & Co.) discovered materials with luminance approximately 10 times greater than zinc sulfide and phosphorescence approximately 10 times longer. This has relegated most zinc sulfide based products to the novelty category. Strontium aluminate-based pigments are now used in exit signs, pathway marking, and other safety-related signage.

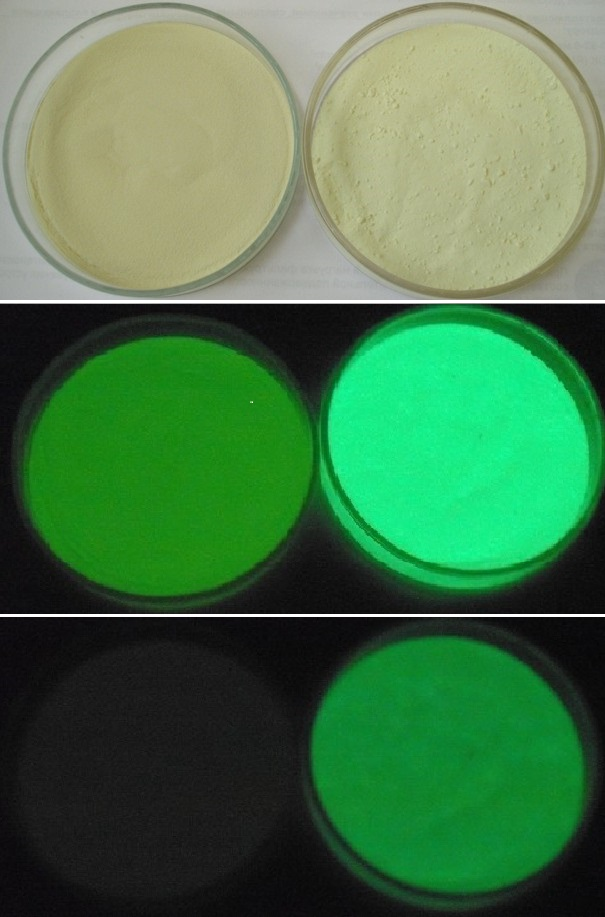
Zinc sulfide (left) and strontium aluminate (right), in visible light, in darkness, and after 4 minutes in the dark.

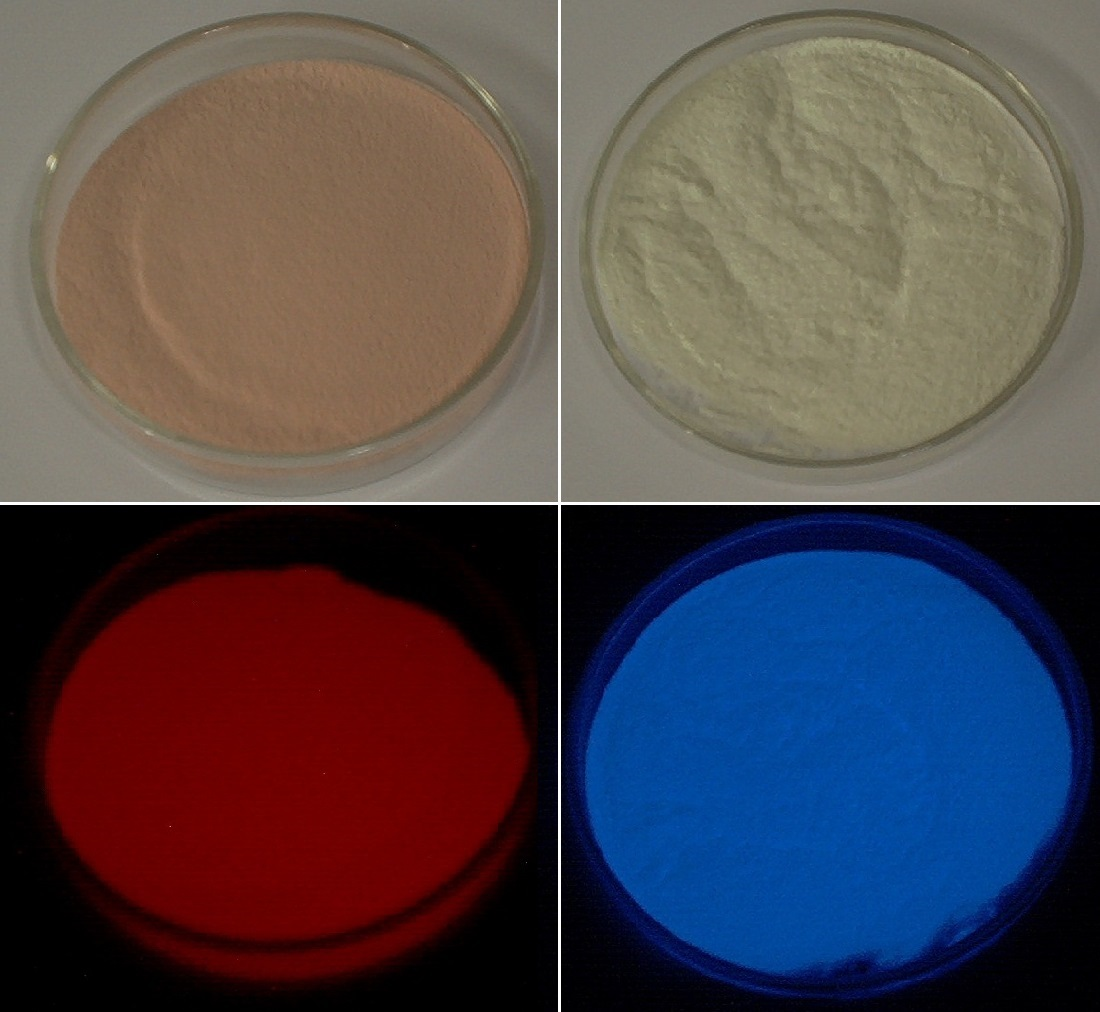
Calcium sulfide (left) and metal-earth silicate (right) phosphoresce in red and blue, respectively.

Since both phosphorescence (transition from T_{1} to S_{0}) and the generation of T_{1} from an excited singlet state (e.g., S_{1}) via intersystem crossing (ISC) are spin-forbidden processes, most organic materials exhibit insignificant phosphorescence as they mostly fail to populate the excited triplet state, and, even if T_{1} is formed, phosphorescence is most frequently outcompeted by non-radiative pathways. One strategy to enhance the ISC and phosphorescence is the incorporation of heavy atoms, which increase spin-orbit coupling (SOC). Additionally, the SOC (and therefore the ISC) can be promoted by coupling n-π* and π-π* transitions with different angular momenta, also known as Mostafa El-Sayed's rule. Such transitions are typically exhibited by carbonyl or triazine derivatives, and most organic room-temperature phosphorescent (ORTP) materials incorporate such moieties. In turn, to inhibit competitive non-radiative deactivation pathways, including vibrational relaxation and oxygen quenching and triplet-triplet annihilations, organic phosphors have to be embedded in rigid matrices such as polymers, and molecular solids (crystals, covalent organic frameworks, and others).

== Uses ==
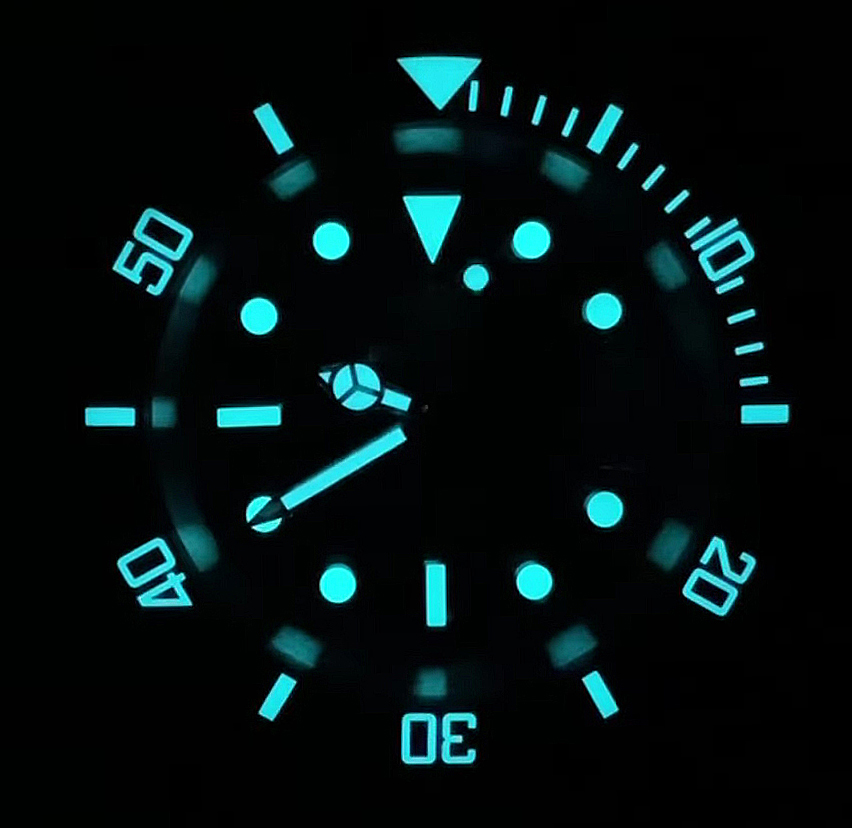
Phosphorescent elements of a wristwatch that had been exposed to bright (ultraviolet) light

In 1974 Becky Schroeder was given a US patent for the "Glow Sheet" which used phosphorescent lines under writing paper to help people write in low-light conditions.

Glow-in-the-dark material is added to some disc golf discs, allowing the game to be played at night.

Watch faces are often painted with phosphorescent colours, allowing them to be used in absolute darkness hours after exposure to bright light.

A common use of phosphorescence is decoration. Glow-in-the-dark plastic stars are placed on walls, ceilings, or hung from strings make a room look like the night sky. Other objects like figurines, cups, posters, lamp fixtures, toys and bracelet beads may also glow. Using blacklights makes these things glow brightly, common at raves, bedrooms, theme parks, and festivals.

== Shadow wall ==
A shadow wall is created when a light flashes upon a person or object in front of a phosphorescent screen which temporarily captures the shadow. The screen or wall is painted with a glow-in-the-dark product that contains phosphorescent compounds. These shadow walls are exhibits at some science museums.

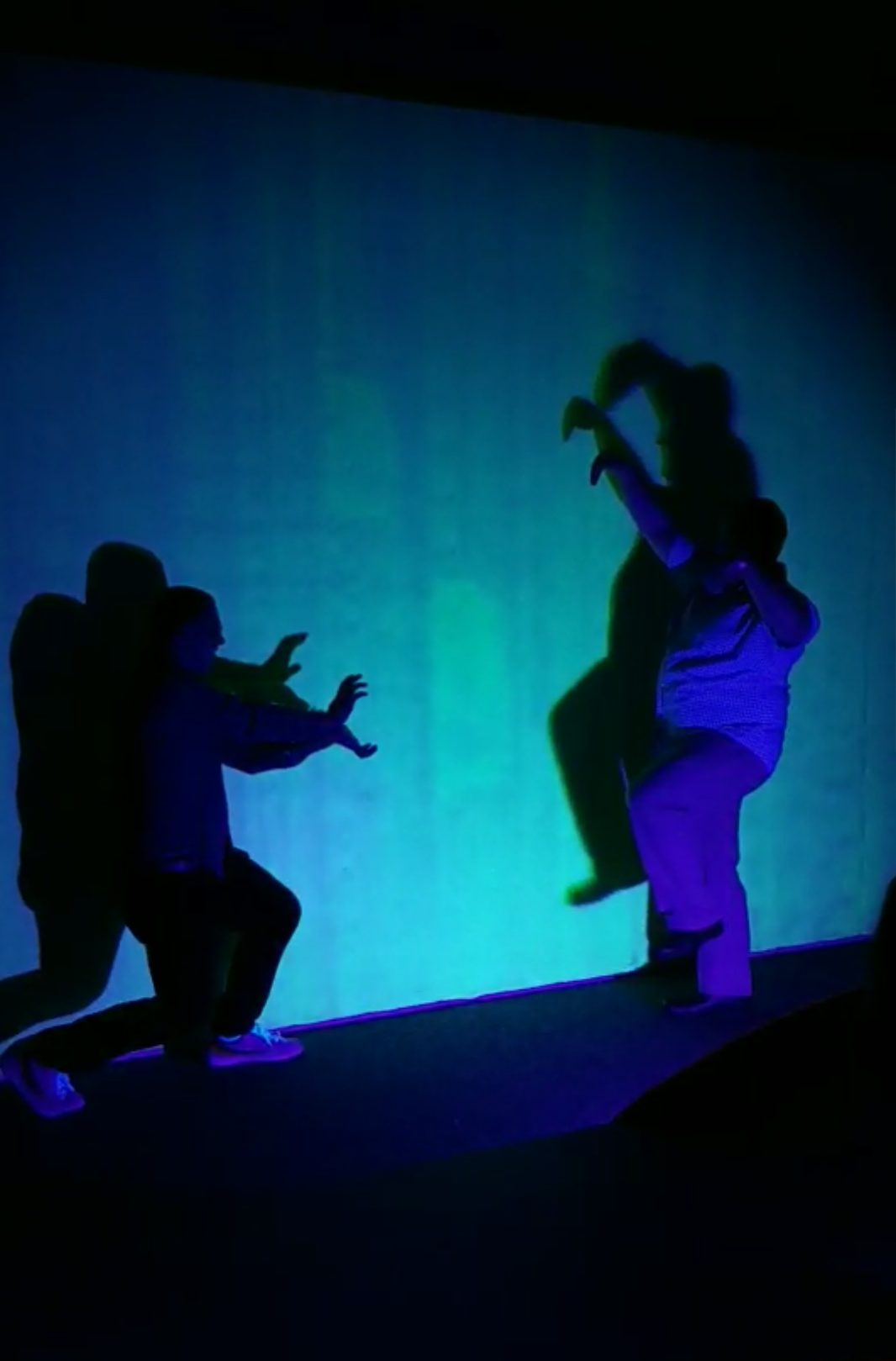
A phosphorescent wall is being illuminated; shadows are present.

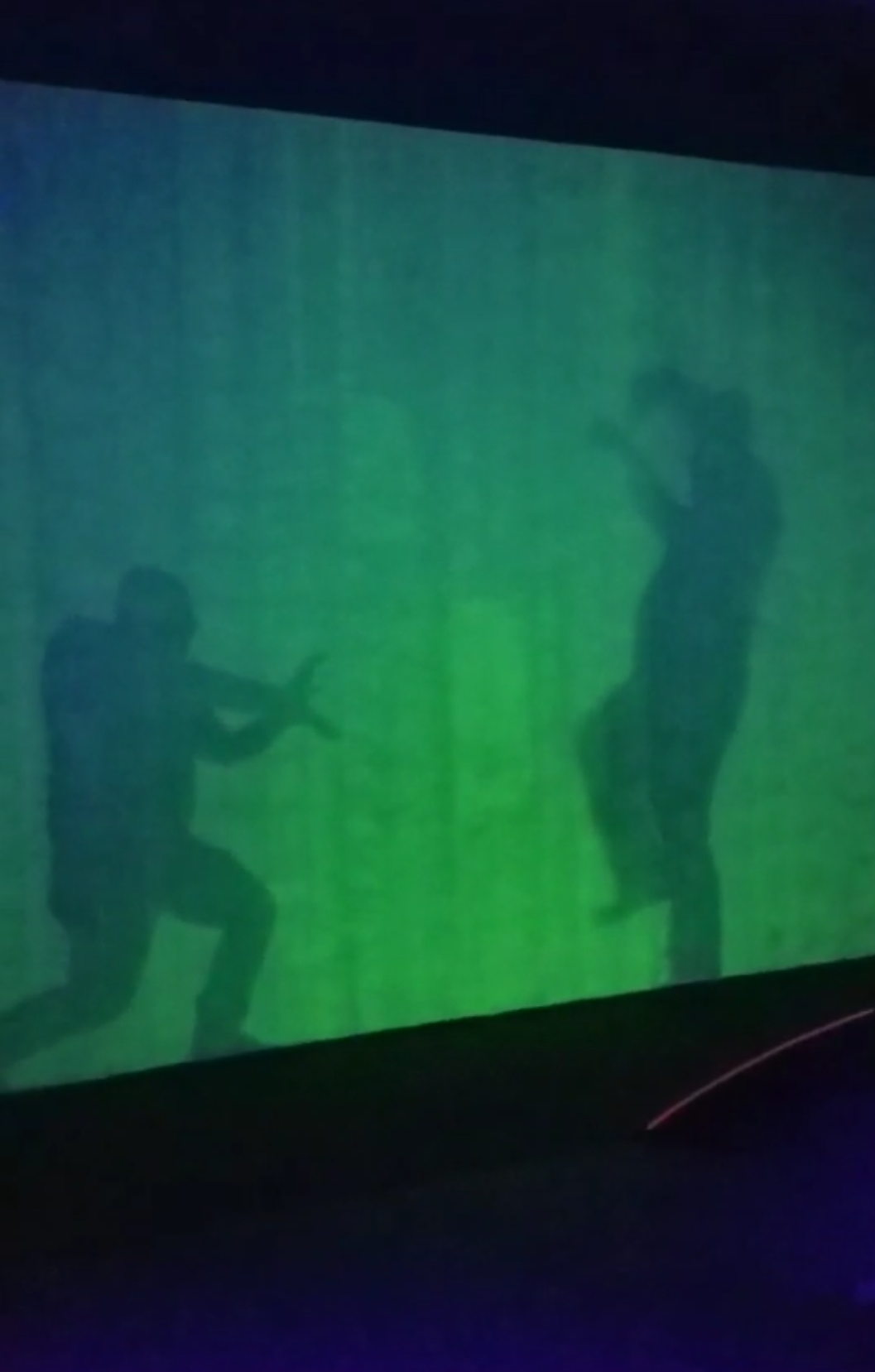
After removing the light source, shadows are visible on the wall.

== See also ==
- Fluorescence
- Luminous gemstones
- Luminous paint
- Microsphere
- Persistent luminescence
- Phosphor
- Phosphoroscope
- Physical crystallography before X-rays
- Tritium
