= Baryte =

Barium sulfate mineral

Barite
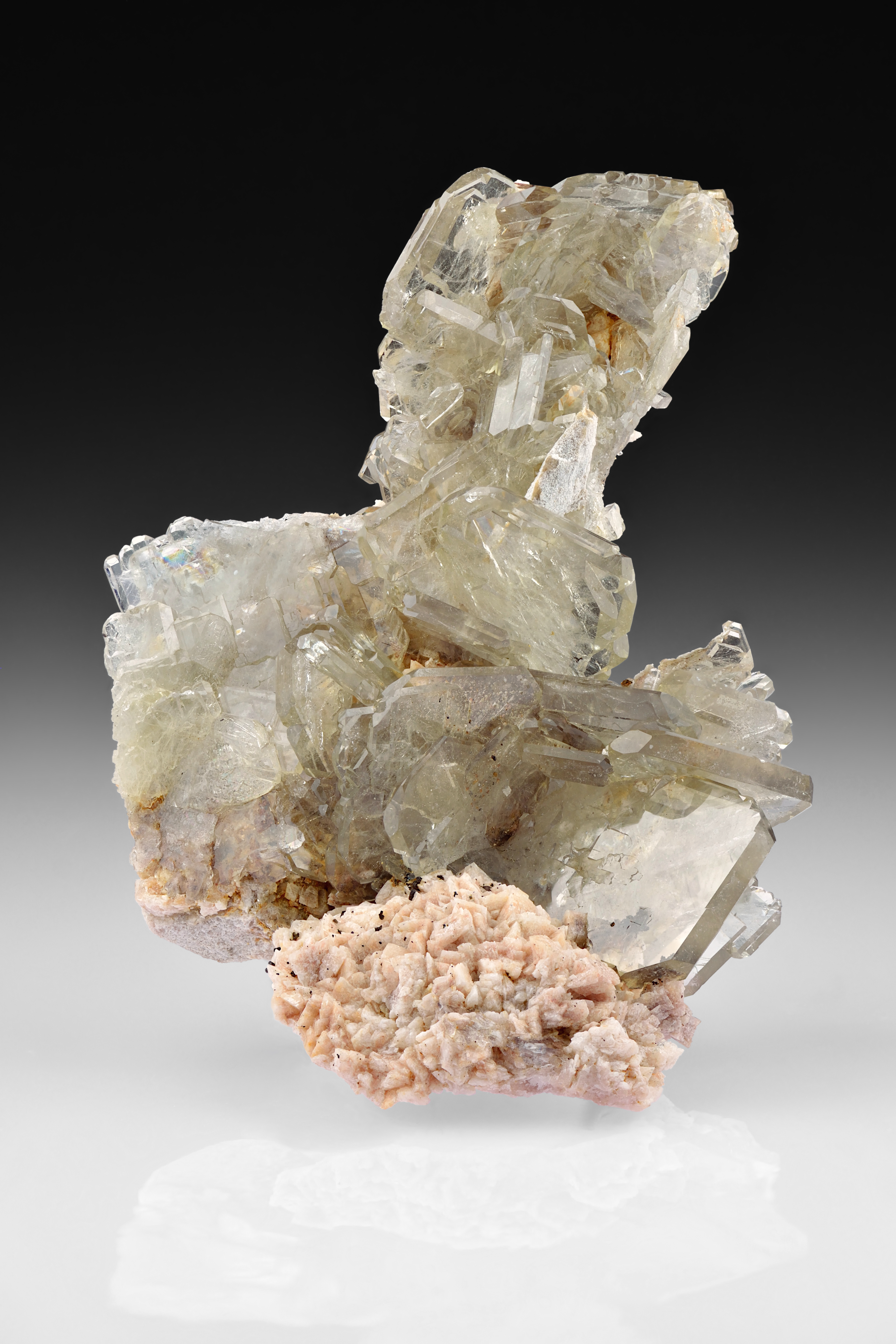
- Baryte crystals from Cerro Huarihuyn, Miraflores, Huamalíes, Huánuco, Peru

General
- Category: Sulfate mineral, barite group
- Formula: BaSO_{4}
- IMA symbol: Brt
- Strunz classification: 7.AD.35
- Dana classification: 28.03.01.01
- Crystal system: Orthorhombic
- Crystal class: Dipyramidal (mmm); H-M symbol: (2/m 2/m 2/m)
- Space group: Pnma
- Unit cell: a = 8.884(2) Å, b = 5.457(3) Å, c = 7.157(2) Å; Z = 4

Identification
- Color: Colorless, white, light shades of blue, yellow, grey, brown
- Crystal habit: Tabular parallel to base, fibrous, nodular to massive
- Cleavage: Perfect cleavage parallel to base and prism faces: {001} Perfect, {210} Perfect, {010} Imperfect
- Fracture: Irregular/uneven
- Tenacity: Brittle
- Mohs scale hardness: 3–3.5
- Luster: Vitreous, pearly
- Streak: White
- Diaphaneity: transparent to opaque
- Specific gravity: 4.3–4.5
- Density: 4.48 g/cm^{3}
- Optical properties: biaxial positive
- Refractive index: n_{α} = 1.634–1.637 n_{β} = 1.636–1.638 n_{γ} = 1.646–1.648
- Birefringence: 0.012
- Fusibility: 4, yellowish green barium flame
- Diagnostic features: white color, high specific gravity, characteristic cleavage and crystals
- Solubility: low

Baryte or barite (/ˈbæraɪt, ˈbɛər-/ BARR-eyet, BAIR-), also called barytes (/bəˈraɪtiːz/ bə-RY-teez), is a mineral consisting of barium sulfate (BaSO_{4}). Baryte is generally white or colorless, and is the main source of the element barium. The baryte group consists of baryte, celestine (strontium sulfate), anglesite (lead sulfate), and anhydrite (calcium sulfate). Baryte and celestine form a solid solution (Ba,Sr)SO_{4}.

== Names and history ==
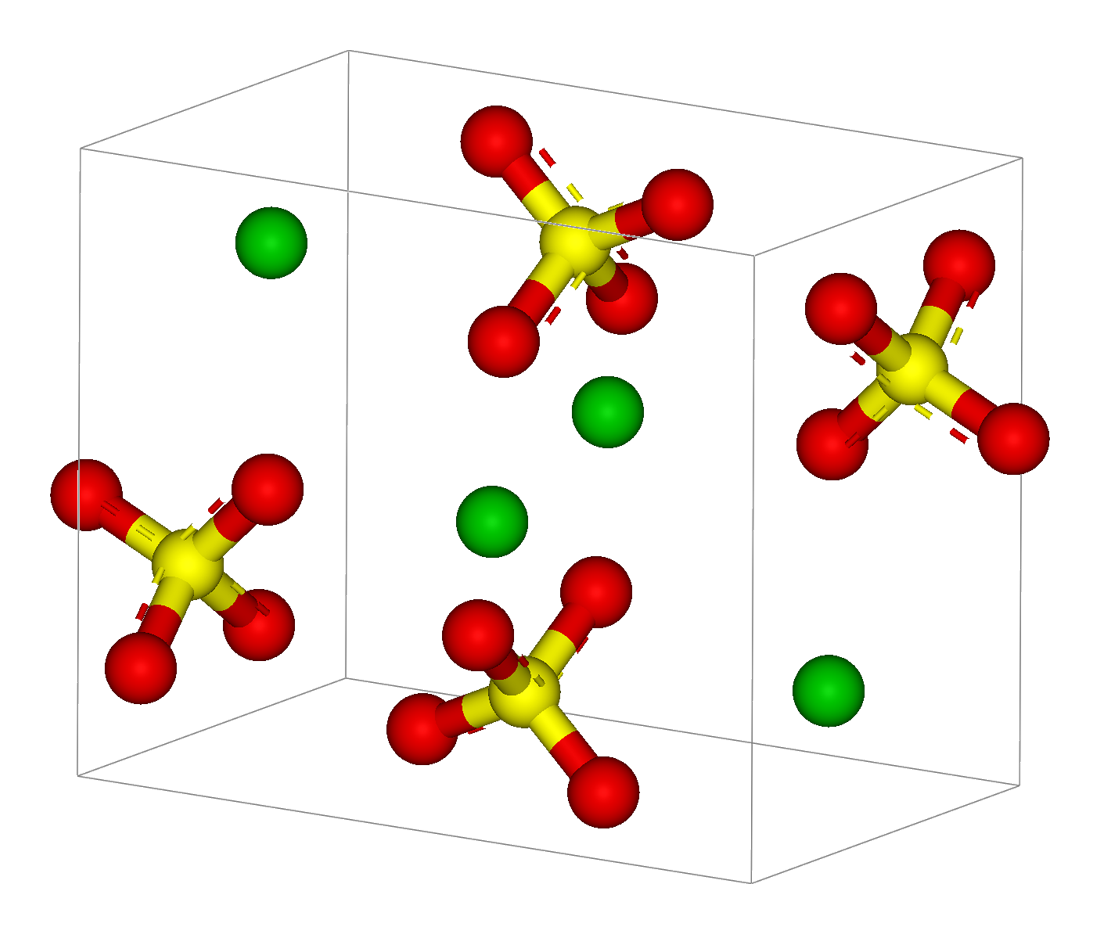
The unit cell of baryte

The radiating form, sometimes referred to as Bologna Stone, attained some notoriety among alchemists for specimens found in the 17th century near Bologna by Vincenzo Casciarolo. These became phosphorescent upon being calcined.

Carl Scheele determined that baryte contained a new element in 1774, but could not isolate barium, only barium oxide. Johan Gottlieb Gahn also isolated barium oxide two years later in similar studies. Barium was first isolated by electrolysis of molten barium salts in 1808 by Sir Humphry Davy in England.

Baryte was called tuf blanc, or also tiff, in Missouri by the local French population, and when it was initially found, it was often discarded as efforts focused on lead mining. By the late nineteenth century, however, it became valuable with the rise of the petroleum industry. Near Potosi, historical records indicate that Creole piocheurs and their families would dig it from shallow pits until a mechanized process was introduced in the twentieth century.

The American Petroleum Institute specification API 13/ISO 13500, which governs baryte for drilling purposes, does not refer to any specific mineral, but rather a material that meets that specification. In practice, however, this is usually the mineral baryte.

The term "primary barytes" refers to the first marketable product, which includes crude baryte (run of mine) and the products of simple beneficiation methods, such as washing, jigging, heavy media separation, tabling, and flotation. Most crude baryte requires some upgrading to minimum purity or density. Baryte that is used as an aggregate in a "heavy" cement is crushed and screened to a uniform size. Most baryte is ground to a small, uniform size before it is used as a filler or extender, an addition to industrial products, in the production of barium chemicals, or as a weighting agent in petroleum well drilling mud.

=== Name ===
The name baryte is derived from the Ancient Greek: βαρύς, romanized: barús, 'heavy'. The American spelling is barite. The International Mineralogical Association initially adopted "barite" as the official spelling, but recommended adopting the older "baryte" spelling later. This move was controversial and was notably ignored by American mineralogists.

Other names have been used for baryte, including barytine, barytite, barytes, heavy spar, tiff, and blanc fixe.

== Mineral associations and locations ==
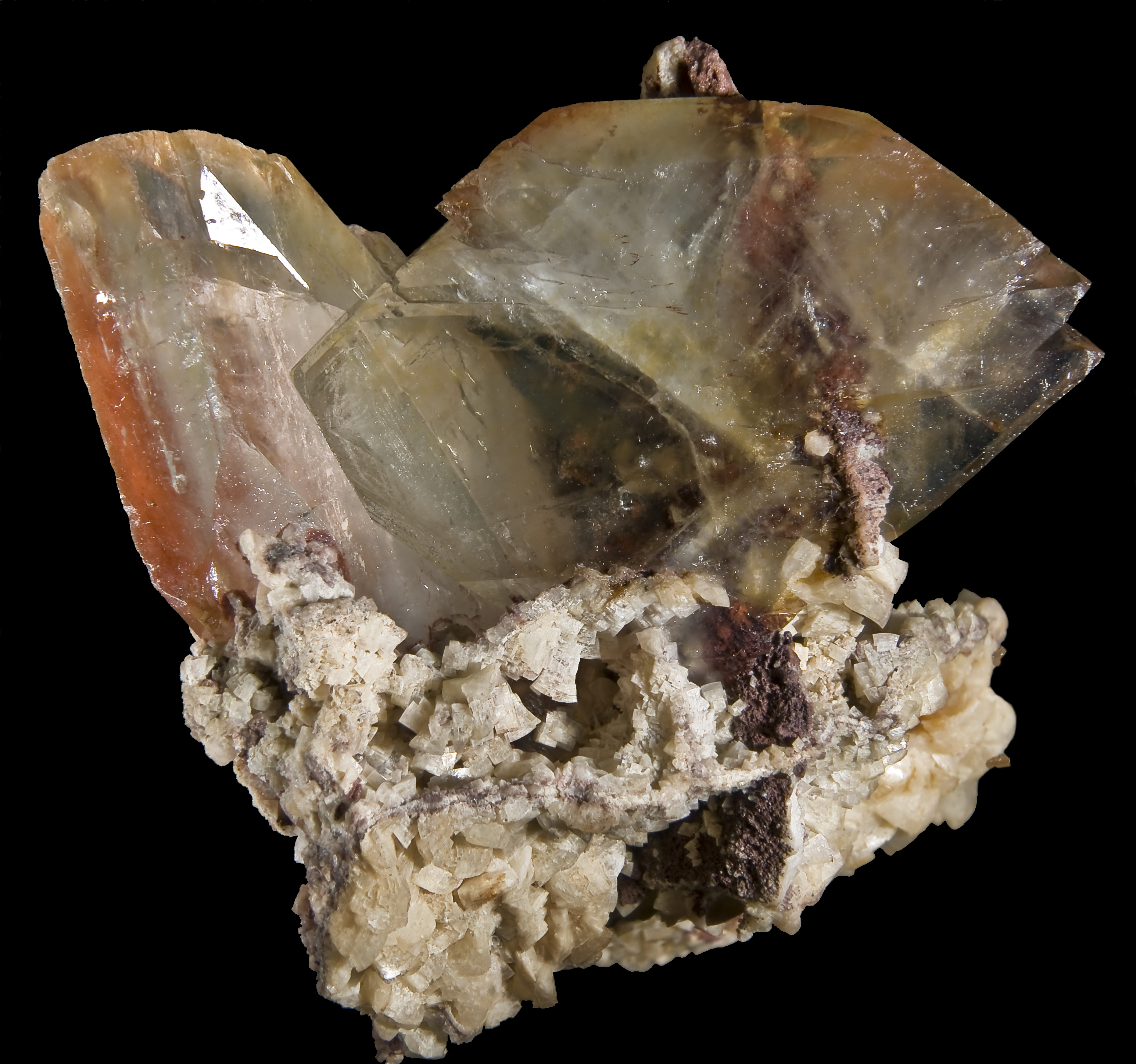
Baryte (top) and dolomite from Cumbria, England

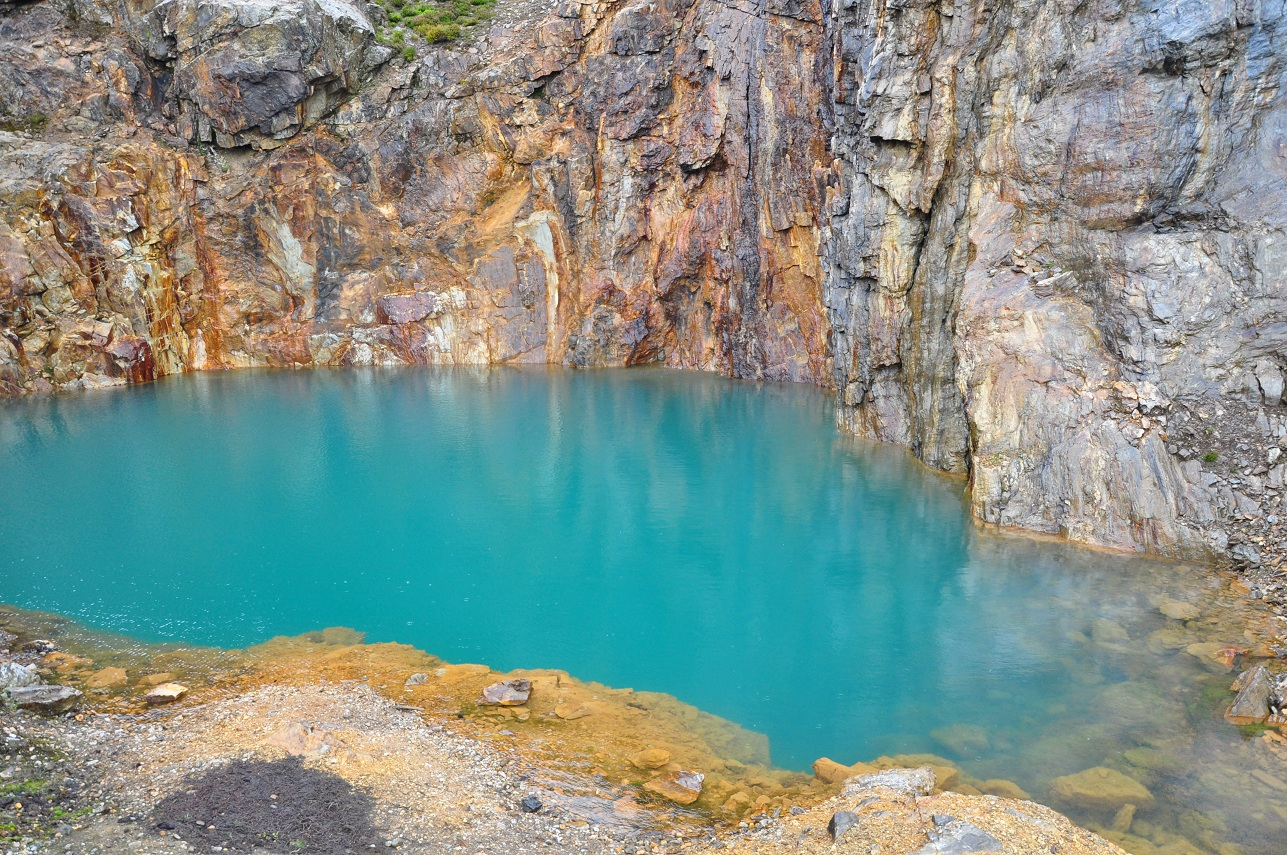
Abandoned baryte mine shaft near Aberfeldy, Perthshire, Scotland

Baryte occurs in many depositional environments, and is deposited through many processes including biogenic, hydrothermal, and evaporative ones, among others. Baryte commonly occurs in lead-zinc veins in limestones, in hot spring deposits, and with hematite ore. It is often associated with the minerals anglesite and celestine. It has also been identified in meteorites.

Baryte has been found at locations in Australia, Brazil, Nigeria, Canada, Chile, China, India, Pakistan, Germany, Greece, Guatemala, Iran, Ireland (where it was mined on Benbulben), Liberia, Mexico, Morocco, Peru, Romania (Baia Sprie), Turkey, South Africa (Barberton Mountain Land), Thailand, the United Kingdom (Cornwall, Cumbria, Dartmoor/Devon, Derbyshire, Durham, Shropshire, Perthshire, Argyllshire, and Surrey), and the US (Cheshire, Connecticut, De Kalb, New York, and Fort Wallace, New Mexico). It is mined in Arkansas, Connecticut, Virginia, North Carolina, Georgia, Tennessee, Kentucky, Nevada, and Missouri.

The global production of baryte in 2019 was estimated to be around 9.5 million metric tons, down from 9.8 million metric tons in 2012. The major baryte producers (in thousand tonnes, data for 2017) are as follows: China (3,600), India (1,600), Morocco (1,000), Mexico (400), United States (330), Iran (280), Turkey (250), Russia (210), Kazakhstan (160), Thailand (130), and Laos (120).

The main users of baryte in 2017 were (in million tonnes) US (2.35), China (1.60), Middle East (1.55), the European Union and Norway (0.60), Russia and CIS (0.5), South America (0.35), Africa (0.25), and Canada (0.20). 70% of baryte was destined for oil and gas well drilling muds, 15% for barium chemicals, 14% for filler applications in automotive, construction, and paint industries, and 1% other applications.

Natural baryte formed under hydrothermal conditions may be associated with quartz or silica. In hydrothermal vents, the baryte-silica mineralisation can also be accompanied by precious metals.

Information about the mineral resource base of baryte ores is presented in some scientific articles.

== Uses ==
Baryte production

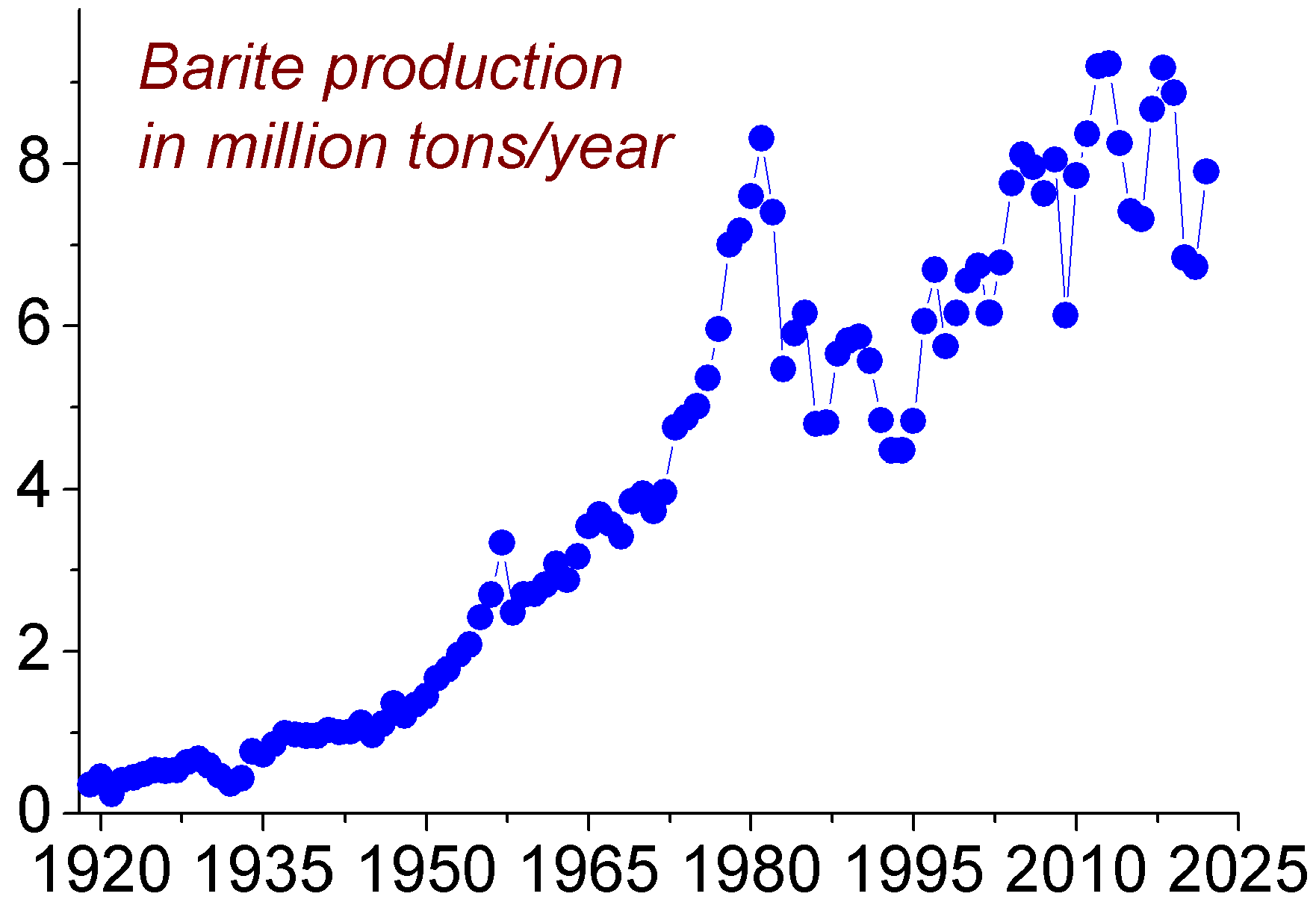

=== Oil and gas drilling ===
Worldwide, 69–77% of baryte is used as a weighting agent for drilling fluids in oil and gas exploration to suppress high formation pressures and prevent blowouts. As a well is drilled, the bit passes through various formations, each with different characteristics. The deeper the hole, the more baryte is needed as a percentage of the total mud mix. An additional benefit of baryte is that it is non-magnetic and thus does not interfere with magnetic measurements taken in the borehole, either during logging-while-drilling or in separate drill-hole logging. Baryte used for drilling petroleum wells can be black, blue, brown, or gray depending on the ore body. The baryte is finely ground so that at least 97% of the material, by weight, can pass through a 200-mesh (75 μm) screen, and no more than 30%, by weight, can be less than 6 μm diameter. The ground baryte also must be dense enough so that it has a specific gravity of 4.2 or greater, is soft enough to not damage the bearings of a tricone drill bit, is chemically inert, and contains no more than 250 milligrams per kilogram of soluble alkaline salts. In August 2010, the American Petroleum Institute published specifications to modify the 4.2 drilling grade standards for baryte to include 4.1 SG materials.

=== Oxygen and sulfur isotopic analysis ===
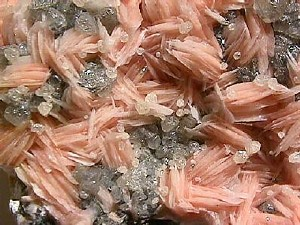
Baryte (salmon-colored) with cerussite from Morocco

In the deep ocean, away from continental sources of sediment, pelagic baryte precipitates and forms a significant amount of the sediments. Since baryte has oxygen, systematics in the δ^{18}O of these sediments have been used to help constrain paleotemperatures for oceanic crust.

The variations in sulfur isotopes (^{34}S/^{32}S) are being examined in evaporite minerals containing sulfur (e.g. baryte) and carbonate-associated sulfates to determine past seawater sulfur concentrations, which can help identify specific depositional periods such as anoxic or oxic conditions. The use of sulfur isotope reconstruction is often paired with oxygen when a molecule contains both elements.

=== Geochronological dating ===
Dating the baryte in hydrothermal vents has been one of the major methods to determine their ages. Common methods to date hydrothermal baryte include radiometric dating and electron spin resonance dating.

=== Other uses ===
Baryte is used in added-value applications which include filler in paint and plastics, sound reduction in engine compartments, coat of automobile finishes for smoothness and corrosion resistance, friction products for automobiles and trucks, radiation-shielding concrete, glass ceramics, and medical applications (for example, a barium meal before a contrast CT scan). Baryte is supplied in a variety of forms, and the price depends on the amount of processing; filler applications command higher prices following intense physical processing by grinding and micronising, and there are further premiums for whiteness and brightness and color. It is also used to produce other barium chemicals, notably barium carbonate which is used for the manufacture of LED glass for television and computer screens (historically in cathode-ray tubes) and for dielectrics.

Historically, baryte was used for the production of barium hydroxide for sugar refining, and as a white pigment for textiles, paper, and paint.

Although baryte contains the toxic alkaline earth metal barium, it is not detrimental for human health, animals, plants, and the environment because barium sulfate is extremely insoluble in water.

It is also sometimes used as a gemstone.

== See also ==
- Hokutolite
- Rose rock
