= Schenck ene reaction =

Organic reaction

The Schenck ene reaction or the Schenk reaction is the reaction of singlet oxygen with alkenes to yield hydroperoxides. The hydroperoxides can be reduced to allylic alcohols or eliminate to form unsaturated carbonyl compounds. It is a type II photooxygenation reaction, and is discovered in 1944 by Günther Otto Schenck. Its results are similar to ene reactions, hence its name.

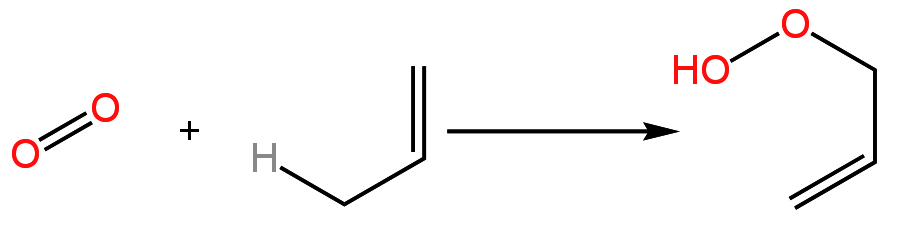
The Schenck ene reaction

== Reaction conditions ==
The singlet oxygen reagent can be produced via photochemical activation of triplet oxygen (regular oxygen) in the presence of photosensitizers like rose bengal. Chemical processes like the reaction between hydrogen peroxide and sodium hypochlorite are also viable.

== Mechanism and selectivity ==
Historically, four mechanisms have been proposed:

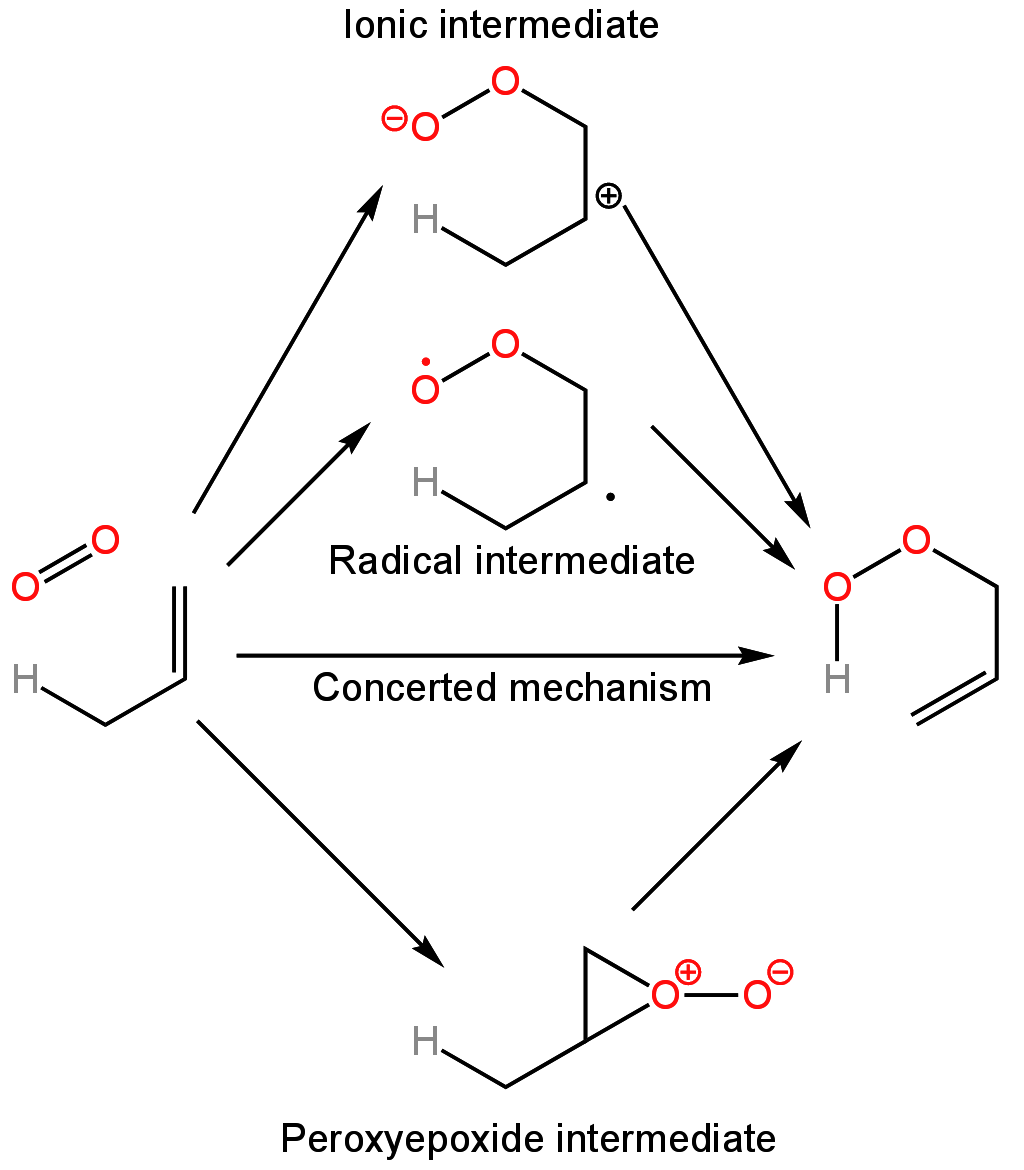
Four proposed intermediates of the Schenck ene reaction

Experimental and computational studies show that the reaction actually proceeds via a two step no intermediate process. One can loosely interpret it as a mix of the perepoxide mechanism and the concerted mechanism. There is no perepoxide intermediate as in the classical sense of reaction intermediates, for there exists no energy barrier between it and the hydroperoxide product.

Such a mechanism can account for the selectivity of the Schenck ene reaction. The singlet oxygen is more likely to abstract hydrogen from the side with more C-H bonds due to favorable interactions in the transition state:

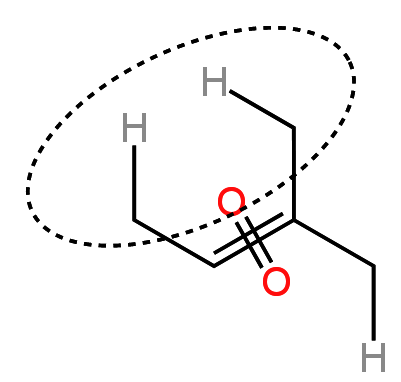

Very bulky groups, like the tertiary butyl group, will hinder hydrogen abstraction on that side.

== Applications ==
The Schenck ene reaction is utilized in the biological and biomimetic synthesis of rhodonoids, yield

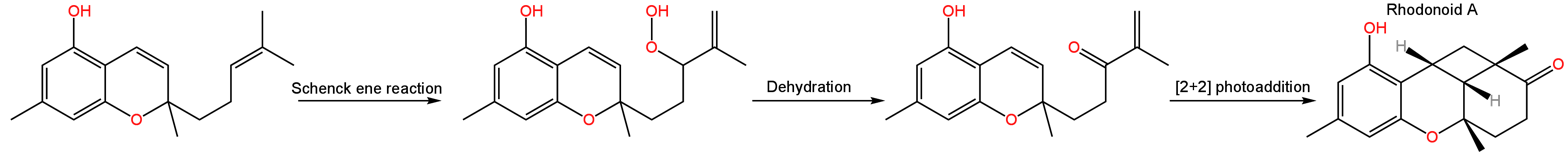
Biological synthesis of rhodonoid A

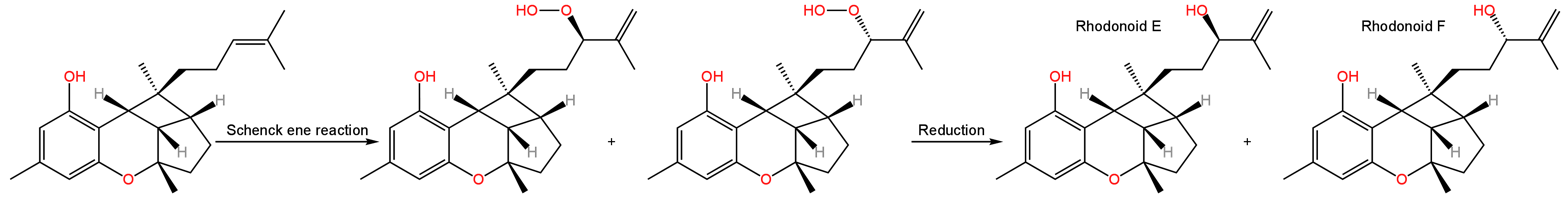
Organic synthesis of rhodonoid E and F

Many hydroperoxides derived from fatty acids, steroids, and terpenes are also formed via the Schenck ene reaction. For instance, the generation of cis-3-hexenal from linolenic acid:

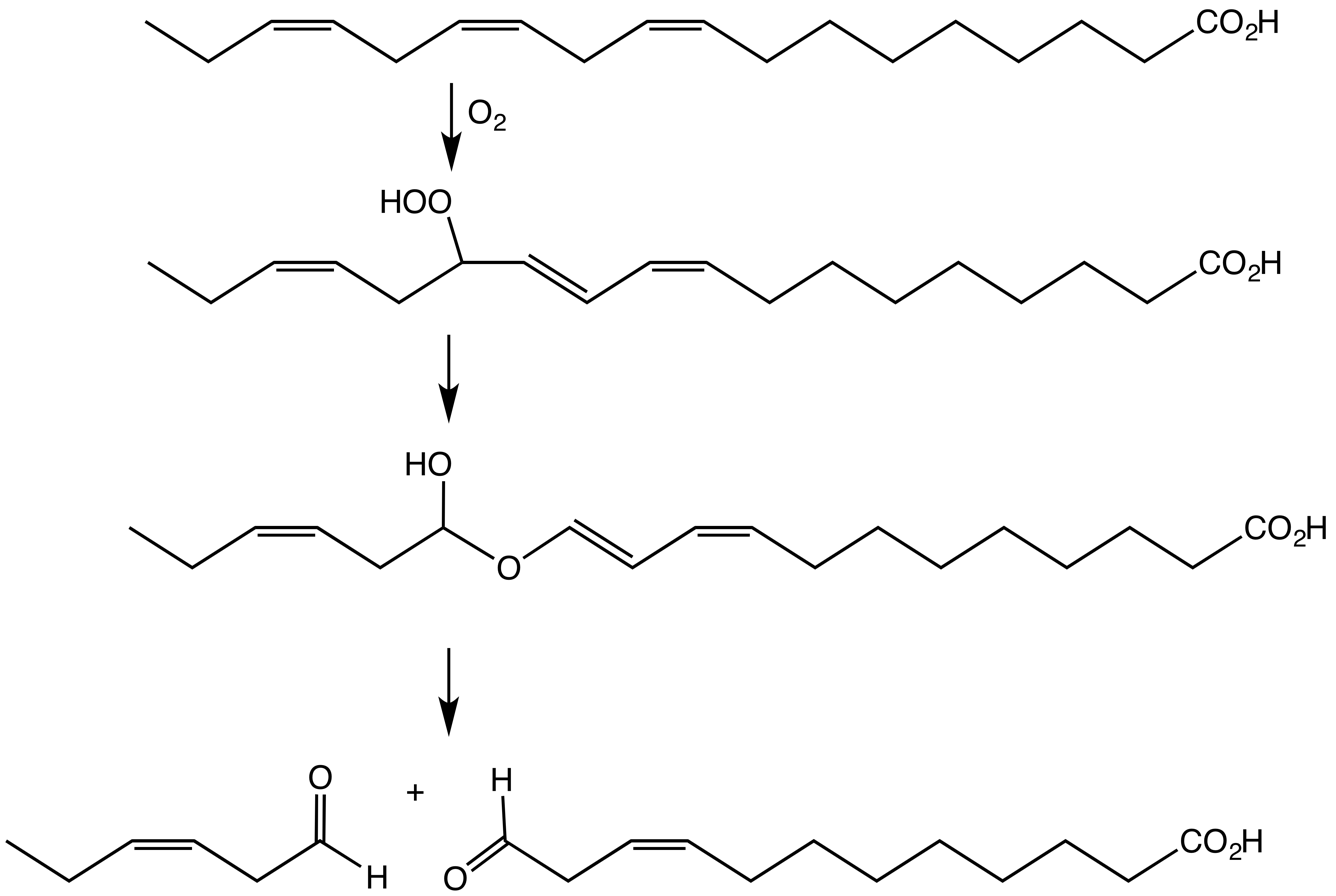
Cis-3-hexenal is generated by conversion of linolenic acid to the hydroperoxide by the action of a lipoxygenase followed by the lyase-induced formation of the hemiacetal.

This enzyme catalyzed path follows a different mechanism from the usual Schenck ene reaction. Radicals are involved, and triplet oxygen is used instead of singlet oxygen.

== See also ==
- Ene reaction
- Photooxygenation
- Singlet oxygen
- Hydroperoxide
