= Triphenyl phosphite ozonide =

Names
- IUPAC name 4,4,4-triphenoxy-1,2,3,4^{λ}5-trioxaphosphetane

Identifiers
CAS Number	29833-83-8
3D model (JSmol)	Interactive image
Abbreviations	TPPO
ChemSpider	10450618
PubChem CID	12503112
- InChI: InChI=1S/C18H15O6P/c1-4-10-16(11-5-1)19-25(23-22-24-25,20-17-12-6-2-7-13-17)21-18-14-8-3-9-15-18/h1-15H Key: BVCCTQHXJQXLKM-UHFFFAOYSA-N
- SMILES: C1=CC=C(C=C1)OP2(OOO2)(OC3=CC=CC=C3)OC4=CC=CC=C4

Properties
Chemical formula	C_{18}H_{15}O_{6}P
Molar mass	358.286 g·mol^{−1}
- Except where otherwise noted, data are given for materials in their standard state (at 25 °C [77 °F], 100 kPa). Infobox references

Triphenyl phosphite ozonide (TPPO) is a chemical compound with the formula PO_{3}(C_{6}H_{5}O)_{3} that is used to generate singlet oxygen.

When TPPO is mixed with amines, the ozonide breaks down into singlet oxygen and leaves behind triphenyl phosphate. Pyridine is the only known amine that can effectively cause the breakdown of TPPO while not quenching any of the produced oxygen.

== Synthesis ==
Triphenyl phosphite ozonide is created by bubbling dry ozone through dichloromethane with triphenyl phosphite being added dropwise at -78 °C. If triphenyl phosphite is added in excess in the synthesis, TPPO can be reduced to triphenyl phosphite oxide, PO(C_{6}H_{5}O)_{3,} and oxygen gas.
