= De Phenomenis in Orbe Lunae =

Book by Giulio Cesare la Galla

De Phenomenis in Orbe Lunae is a 1612 book by Collegio Romano philosophy professor Giulio Cesare la Galla that describes emission of light by a stone. La Galla's inspiration came from Galileo's debate with Vincenzo Casciarolo regarding a "lapis solaris," a stone that emitted light seemingly on its own. In De Phenomenis, de Galla asserts that the stone was only able to emit light after the stone itself had calcified. It released "a certain quantity of fire and light" that it had absorbed, just as water would be absorbed by a sponge.

Robert Burton discusses De Phenomenis in The Anatomy of Melancholy.
