= Persistent luminescence =

Phosphorescence

Commonly referred to as phosphorescence, persistent luminescence is the emission of light by a phosphorescent material after an excitation by ultraviolet or visible light.

== Mechanism ==
The mechanism underlying this phenomenon is not fully understood. It is neither fluorescence nor phosphorescence. In fluorescence, the lifetime of the excited state lasts a few nanoseconds. In phosphorescence, even if the emission lives several seconds, this is due to deexcitation between two electronic states of different spin multiplicity. Persistent luminescence involves energy traps (such as electron or hole traps) in a material, which are filled during the excitation. Afterward, the stored energy is gradually released to light emitter centers, usually by a fluorescence-like mechanism.

== Examples of use ==
Persistent luminescence materials are mainly used in safety signs, watch dials, decorative objects, and toys. They have also been used as nanoprobes in small animal optical imaging.

== See also ==
- Luminous paint
- Strontium aluminate
