= Triplet oxygen =

Triplet state of the dioxygen molecule

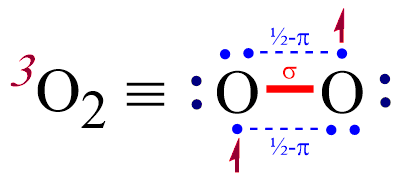

Names
- IUPAC name Triplet oxygen
- Systematic IUPAC name: Dioxidanediyl (substitutive); dioxygen(2•)(triplet) (additive)

Identifiers
| CAS Number | 7782-44-7 |
| 3D model (JSmol) | Interactive image; Interactive image |
| ChEBI | CHEBI:27140 |
| ChemSpider | 952 |
| EC Number | 231-956-9 |
| Gmelin Reference | 492 |
| KEGG | D00003 |
| MeSH | Oxygen |
| PubChem CID | 977 |
| RTECS number | RS2060000 |
| UNII | S88TT14065 |
| UN number | 1072 |
- InChI: InChI=1S/O2/c1-2 Key: MYMOFIZGZYHOMD-UHFFFAOYSA-N
- SMILES: [O]#[O]; [O][O]

Properties
| Chemical formula | O_{2} |
| Molar mass | 31.998 g·mol^{−1} |
| Appearance | Colorless gas |
| Density | 0.0014 g/cm^{3} (0 °C (32 °F; 273 K)) |
| Melting point | −218 °C (−360.4 °F; 55.1 K) |
| Boiling point | −183 °C (−297.4 °F; 90.1 K) |

Structure
| Molecular shape | Linear |
| Dipole moment | 0 D |

Thermochemistry
| Std molar entropy (S^{⦵}_{298}) | 205.152 J⋅mol^{−1}·K^{-1} |
| Std enthalpy of formation (Δ_{f}H^{⦵}_{298}) | 0 kJ⋅mol^{−1} |

Pharmacology
| ATC code | V03AN01 (WHO) |

Hazards
- GHS labelling
| Pictograms | (GHS03: Oxidizing) (GHS04: Compressed Gas) |
| Signal word | Danger |
| Hazard statements | H270, H280 |
| Precautionary statements | P220, P244, P370+P376, P410+P403 |
| NFPA 704 (fire diamond) | 0 0 0 OX |
- Except where otherwise noted, data are given for materials in their standard state (at 25 °C [77 °F], 100 kPa). Infobox references

Triplet oxygen, ^{3}O_{2}, refers to the S = 1 electronic ground state of molecular oxygen (dioxygen). Molecules of triplet oxygen contain two unpaired electrons, making triplet oxygen an unusual example of a stable and commonly encountered diradical: it is more stable as a triplet than a singlet. According to molecular orbital theory, the electron configuration of triplet oxygen has two electrons occupying two π molecular orbitals (MOs) of equal energy (that is, degenerate MOs). In accordance with Hund's rules, they remain unpaired and spin-parallel, which accounts for the paramagnetism of molecular oxygen. These half-filled orbitals are antibonding in character, reducing the overall bond order of the molecule to 2 from the maximum value of 3 that would occur when these antibonding orbitals remain fully unoccupied, as in dinitrogen. The molecular term symbol for triplet oxygen is ^{3}𝚺^{−}_{g}.

== Spin ==
The valence orbitals of molecular oxygen (middle); in the ground state, the electrons in the π* orbitals have their spins parallel.

The s = 1/2 spins of the two electrons in degenerate orbitals gives rise to 2×2 = 4 independent spin states in total. Exchange interaction splits these into a singlet state (total spin S = 0) and a set of 3 degenerate triplet states (S = 1). In agreement with Hund's rules, the triplet states are energetically more favorable, and correspond to the ground state of the molecule with a total electron spin of S = 1. Excitation to the S = 0 state results in much more reactive, metastable singlet oxygen.

=== Lewis structure ===
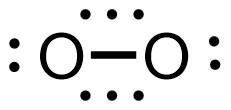
Pauling's Lewis structure for triplet dioxygen.

Because the molecule in its ground state has a non-zero spin magnetic moment, oxygen is paramagnetic; i.e., it can be attracted to the poles of a magnet. Thus, the Lewis structure O=O with all electrons in pairs does not accurately represent the nature of the bonding in molecular oxygen. However, the alternative structure •O−O• is also inadequate, since it implies single bond character, while the experimentally determined bond length of 1.21 Å is much shorter than the single bond in hydrogen peroxide (HO−OH) which has a length of 1.48 Å. This indicates that triplet oxygen has a higher bond order. Molecular orbital theory must be used to correctly account for the observed paramagnetism and short bond length simultaneously. Under a molecular orbital theory framework, the oxygen-oxygen bond in triplet dioxygen is better described as one full σ bond plus two π half-bonds, each half-bond accounted for by two-center three-electron (2c-3e) bonding, to give a net bond order of two (1+2×1/2), while also accounting for the spin state (S = 1). In the case of triplet dioxygen, each 2c-3e bond consists of two electrons in a π_{u} bonding orbital and one electron in a π_{g} antibonding orbital to give a net bond order contribution of 1/2.

The usual rules for constructing Lewis structures must be modified to accommodate molecules like triplet dioxygen or nitric oxide that contain 2c-3e bonds. There is no consensus in this regard; Pauling has suggested the use of three closely spaced collinear dots to represent the three-electron bond (see illustration).

== Observation in liquid state ==
A common experimental way to observe the paramagnetism of dioxygen is to cool it down into the liquid phase. When poured between the poles of strong magnets that are close together the liquid oxygen can be suspended. Or a magnet can pull the stream of liquid oxygen as it is poured. The net magnetic moment of the total electron spin S = 1 provides an explanation of these observations.

== Reaction ==
The unusual electron configuration prevents molecular oxygen from reacting directly with many other molecules, which are often in the singlet state. Triplet oxygen will, however, readily react with molecules in a doublet state to form a new radical.

Conservation of spin quantum number would require a triplet transition state in a reaction of triplet oxygen with a closed shell (a molecule in a singlet state). The extra energy required is sufficient to prevent direct reaction at ambient temperatures with all but the most reactive substrates, e.g. white phosphorus. At higher temperatures or in the presence of suitable catalysts the reaction proceeds more readily. For instance, most flammable substances are characterised by an autoignition temperature at which they will undergo combustion in air without an external flame or spark.

== See also ==
- Spin-forbidden reactions
