= Becky Schroeder =

American child inventor

Rebecca Schroeder (born 1962) is an American inventor and one of the youngest females to be granted a U.S. patent. When Becky was 10 years old she thought of using a backing sheet of paper with phosphorescent lines that could be placed under writing paper that would allow her to write even with no other light available. She was granted U.S. patent 3,832,556 on August 27, 1974, when she was 12 years old. The formal title of her invention is "luminescent backing sheet for writing in the dark," or "Glow Sheet". NASA showed an interest in the invention, since they were working on a similar idea at the time.

Schroeder went on to receive a total of ten patents for this product; the first for the original idea, and nine more for improvements. Her "Glow Sheet" was used by nurses working in hospitals at night so they did not have to wake patients by turning on lights. Sailors in the Navy used the invention at night on ship decks. She also created a version that uses batteries called the "Glo Panel". She sold her inventions through the company she created called B.J. Products, Toledo, Ohio.

Schroeder is from Toledo, Ohio. Her father, Charles Schroeder, was a patent attorney, and also an inventor. In August 1975 she received her second patent. She has since received a number of additional patents for her inventions. Schroeder is featured in a children's non-fiction book called "Girls Think of Everything".
