= Singlet oxygen =

Oxygen with all of its electrons spin paired

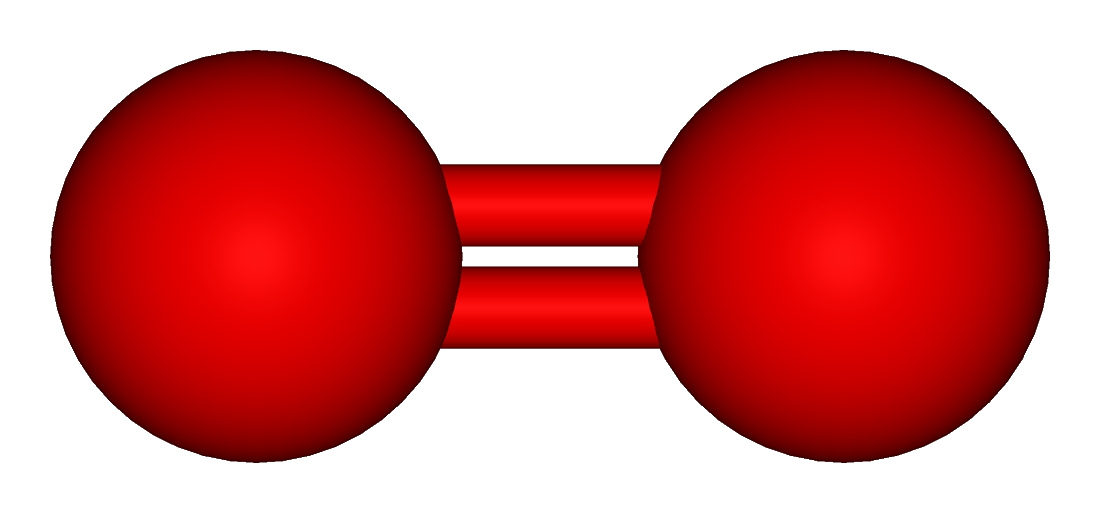

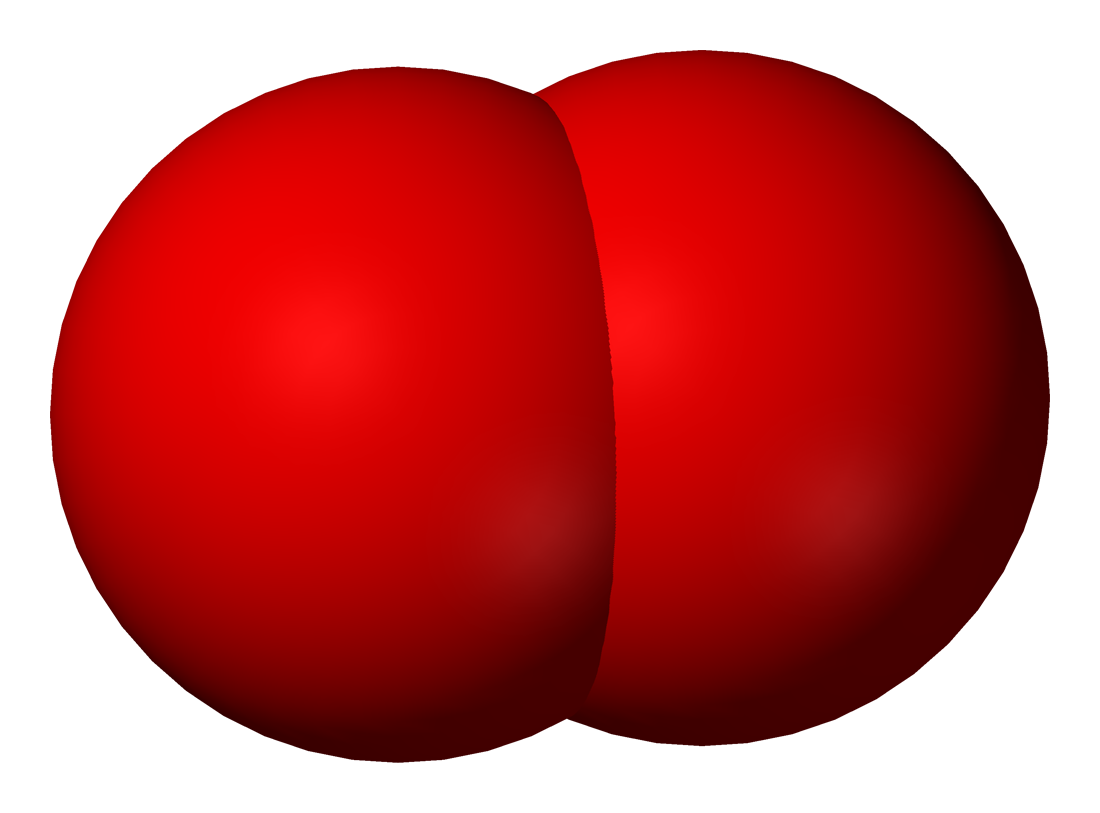

Names
- IUPAC name Singlet oxygen
- Systematic IUPAC name Dioxidene

Identifiers
3D model (JSmol)	Interactive image
ChEBI	CHEBI:26689
Gmelin Reference	491
- InChI: InChI=1S/O2/c1-2 Key: MYMOFIZGZYHOMD-UHFFFAOYSA-N
- SMILES: O=O

Properties
Chemical formula	O_{2}
Molar mass	31.998 g·mol^{−1}
Solubility in water	Reacts
- Except where otherwise noted, data are given for materials in their standard state (at 25 °C [77 °F], 100 kPa). Infobox references

Singlet oxygen, systematically named dioxygen(singlet) and dioxidene, is a gaseous inorganic chemical with two oxygen atoms in a quantum state where all electrons are spin-paired, known as a singlet state. It is the lowest excited state of the diatomic oxygen molecule, which in general has the chemical structure O=O and chemical formula O_{2}. Singlet oxygen can be written more specifically as ^{1}[O_{2}] or ^{1}O_{2}. The more prevalent ground state of O_{2} is known as triplet oxygen. At room temperature, singlet oxygen slowly decays into triplet oxygen, releasing the energy of excitation.

Singlet oxygen is a gas with physical properties differing only subtly from the ground state. In terms of its chemical reactivity, however, singlet oxygen is far more reactive toward organic compounds. It is responsible for the photodegradation of many materials but can be put to constructive use in preparative organic chemistry and photodynamic therapy. Trace amounts of singlet oxygen are found in the upper atmosphere and in polluted urban atmospheres, where it contributes to the formation of lung-damaging nitrogen dioxide. It often appears and coexists confounded in environments that also generate ozone, such as pine forests with photodegradation of turpentine.

The terms "singlet oxygen" and "triplet oxygen" derive from each form's number of electron spins. The singlet has only one possible arrangement of electron spins with a total quantum spin of 0, while the triplet has three possible arrangements of electron spins with a total quantum spin of 1, corresponding to three degenerate states.

In spectroscopic notation, the lowest singlet and triplet forms of O_{2} are labeled ^{1}Δ_{g} and ^{3}Σ^{−}_{g}, respectively.

== Electronic structure ==
Singlet oxygen refers to one of two singlet electronic excited states. The two singlet states are denoted ^{1}Σ^{+}_{g} and ^{1}Δ_{g} (the preceding superscript "1" indicates a singlet state). The singlet states of oxygen are 158 and 95 kilojoules per mole higher in energy than the triplet ground state of oxygen. Under most common laboratory conditions, the higher-energy ^{1}Σ^{+}_{g} singlet state rapidly converts to the more-stable, lower-energy ^{1}Δ_{g} singlet state. This more stable of the two excited states has its two valence electrons spin-paired in one π* orbital while the second π* orbital is empty. This state is referred to by the title term, singlet oxygen, commonly abbreviated ^{1}O_{2}, to distinguish it from the triplet ground state molecule, ^{3}O_{2}.

Molecular orbital theory predicts the electronic ground state denoted by the molecular term symbol ^{3}Σ^{−}_{g}, and two low-lying excited singlet states with term symbols ^{1}Δ_{g} and ^{1}Σ^{+}_{g}. These three electronic states differ only in the spin and the occupancy of oxygen's two antibonding π_{g}-orbitals, which are degenerate (equal in energy). These two orbitals are classified as antibonding and are of higher energy. Following Hund's first rule, in the ground state, these electrons are unpaired and have like (same) spin. This open-shell triplet ground state of molecular oxygen differs from most stable diatomic molecules, which have singlet (^{1}Σ^{+}_{g}) ground states.

Two less-stable, higher-energy excited states are readily accessible from this ground state, again in accordance with Hund's first rule; the first moves one of the high-energy unpaired ground-state electrons from one degenerate orbital to the other, where it "flips" and pairs the other, and creates a new state, a singlet state referred to as the ^{1}Δ_{g} state (a term symbol, where the preceding superscripted "1" indicates it as a singlet state). Alternatively, both electrons can remain in their degenerate ground state orbitals, but the spin of one can "flip" so that it is now opposite to the second (i.e., it is still in a separate degenerate orbital, but no longer of like spin); this also creates a new state, a singlet state referred to as the ^{1}Σ^{+}_{g} state. The ground and first two singlet excited states of oxygen can be described by the simple scheme in the figure below.

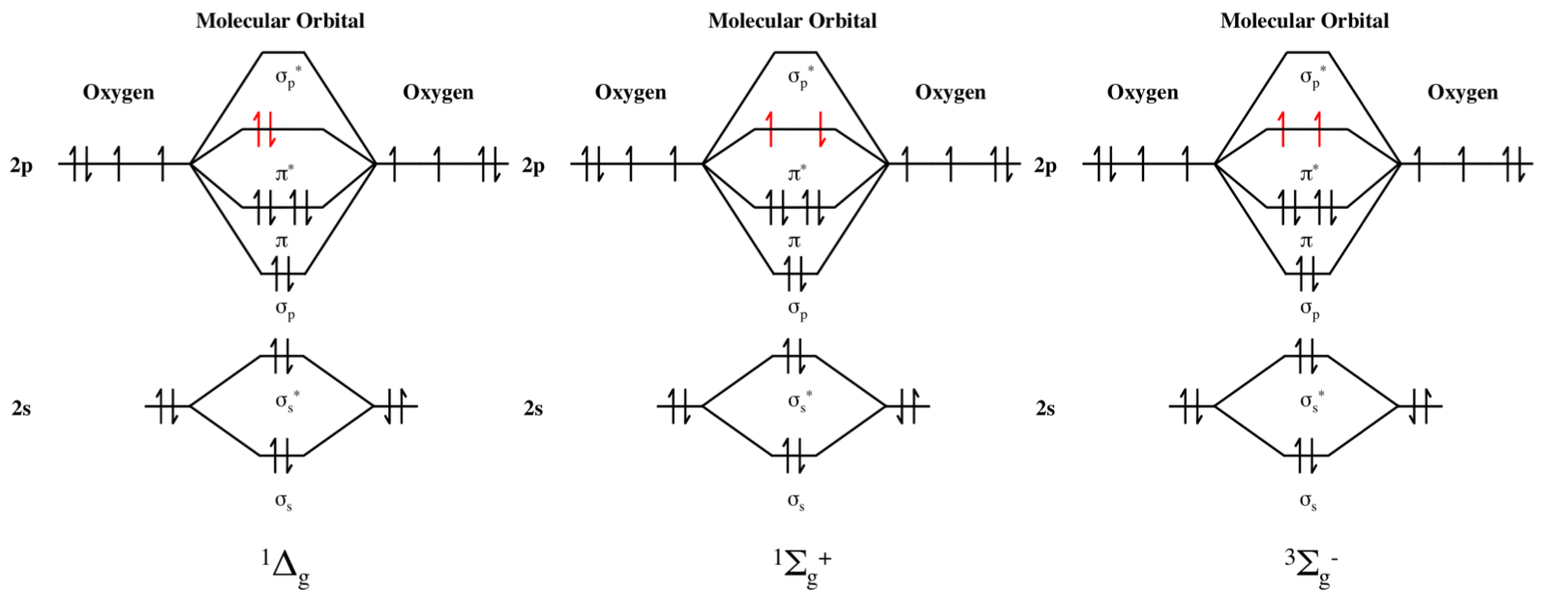
Molecular orbital diagram of two singlet excited states as well as the triplet ground state of molecular dioxygen. From left to right, the diagrams are for: ^{1}Δ_{g} singlet oxygen (first excited state), ^{1}Σ^{+}_{g} singlet oxygen (second excited state), and ^{3}Σ^{−}_{g} triplet oxygen (ground state). The lowest energy 1s molecular orbitals are uniformly filled in all three and are omitted for simplicity. The broad horizontal lines labelled π and π* each represent two molecular orbitals (for filling by up to 4 electrons in total). The three states only differ in the occupancy and spin states of electrons in the two degenerate π* antibonding orbitals.

The ^{1}Δ_{g} singlet state is 7882.4 cm^{−1} above the triplet ^{3}Σ^{−}_{g} ground state., which in other units corresponds to 94.29 kJ/mol or 0.9773 eV. The ^{1}Σ^{+}_{g} singlet is 13120.9 cm^{−1} (157.0 kJ/mol or 1.6268 eV) above the ground state.

Radiative transitions between the three low-lying electronic states of oxygen are formally forbidden as electric dipole processes. The two singlet-triplet transitions are forbidden both because of the spin selection rule ΔS = 0 and because of the parity rule that g-g transitions are forbidden. The singlet-singlet transition between the two excited states is spin-allowed but parity-forbidden.

The lower, O_{2}(^{1}Δ_{g}) state is commonly referred to as singlet oxygen. The energy difference of 94.3 kJ/mol between ground state and singlet oxygen corresponds to a forbidden singlet-triplet transition in the near-infrared at ~1270 nm. As a consequence, singlet oxygen in the gas phase is relatively long lived (54–86 milliseconds), although interaction with solvents reduces the lifetime to microseconds or even nanoseconds. In 2021, the lifetime of airborne singlet oxygen at air/solid interfaces was measured to be 550 μs.

The higher ^{1}Σ^{+}_{g} state is moderately short lived. In the gas phase, it relaxes primarily to the ground state triplet with a mean lifetime of 11.8 seconds. However in solvents such as CS_{2} and CCl_{4}, it relaxes to the lower singlet ^{1}Δ_{g} in milliseconds due to radiationless decay channels.

=== Paramagnetism due to orbital angular momentum ===
Both singlet oxygen states have no unpaired electrons and therefore no net electron spin. The ^{1}Δ_{g} is, however, paramagnetic as shown by the observation of an electron paramagnetic resonance (EPR) spectrum. The paramagnetism of the ^{1}Δ_{g} state is due to a net orbital (and not spin) electronic angular momentum. In a magnetic field, the degeneracy of the M_{L} levels is split into two levels with z projections of angular momenta ±1ħ around the molecular axis. The magnetic transition between these levels gives rise to the g = 1 EPR transition.

== Production ==
Various methods for the production of singlet oxygen exist. Irradiation of oxygen gas in the presence of an organic dye as a sensitizer, such as rose bengal, methylene blue, or porphyrins—a photochemical method—results in its production. Large steady-state concentrations of singlet oxygen are reported from the reaction of triplet excited state pyruvic acid with dissolved oxygen in water. Singlet oxygen can also be produced by chemical procedures without irradiation. One chemical method involves the decomposition of triethylsilyl hydrotrioxide generated in situ from triethylsilane and ozone:

(C_{2}H_{5})_{3}SiH + O_{3} → (C_{2}H_{5})_{3}SiOOOH → (C_{2}H_{5})_{3}SiOH + O_{2}(^{1}Δ_{g})

Another method uses a reaction of hydrogen peroxide with sodium hypochlorite in aqueous solution:

H_{2}O_{2} + NaOCl → O_{2}(^{1}Δ_{g}) + NaCl + H_{2}O

A retro-Diels Alder reaction of the diphenylanthracene peroxide can also yield singlet oxygen, along with an diphenylanthracene:

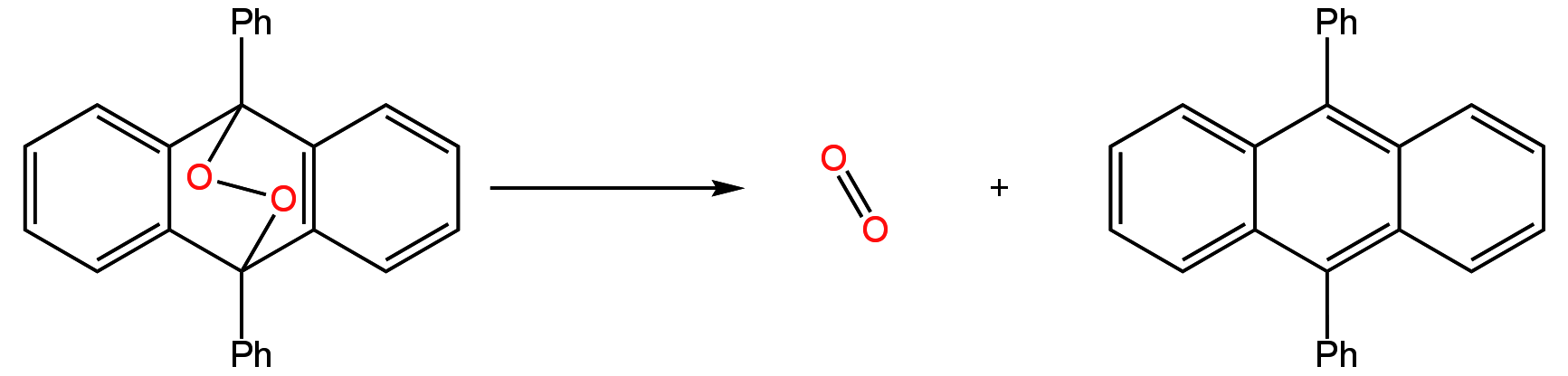

A third method liberates singlet oxygen via phosphite ozonides (e.g. triphenyl phosphite ozonide), which are, in turn, generated in situ. Phosphite ozonides will decompose to give singlet oxygen:

(RO)_{3}P + O_{3} → (RO)_{3}PO_{3}
(RO)_{3}PO_{3} → (RO)_{3}PO + O_{2}(^{1}Δ_{g})

An advantage of this method is that it is amenable to non-aqueous conditions.

Potassium tetraperoxochromate(V) decomposes in water (but not neat) to give singlet oxygen. However, the resulting potassium chromate can also oxidize sensitive substrates.

== Reactions ==
Singlet oxygen-based oxidation of citronellol. This is a net, but not true, ene reaction. Abbreviations, step 1: H_{2}O_{2}, hydrogen peroxide; Na_{2}MoO_{4} (catalyst), sodium molybdate. Step 2: Na_{2}SO_{3} (reducing agent), sodium sulfite.

Because of differences in their electron shells, singlet and triplet oxygen differ in their chemical properties; singlet oxygen is highly reactive. The lifetime of singlet oxygen depends on the medium and pressure. In normal organic solvents, the lifetime is only a few microseconds, whereas in solvents lacking C–H bonds, the lifetime can be as long as seconds.

Unlike ground-state oxygen, singlet oxygen participates in Diels–Alder [4+2]- and [2+2]-cycloaddition reactions and formal concerted ene reactions (Schenck ene reaction), causing photooxygenation. It oxidizes thioethers to sulfoxides. Organometallic complexes are often degraded by singlet oxygen. With some substrates, 1,2-dioxetanes are formed; cyclic dienes such as 1,3-cyclohexadiene form [4+2] cycloaddition adducts.

The [4+2]-cycloaddition between singlet oxygen and furans is widely used in organic synthesis.

In singlet oxygen reactions with alkenic allyl groups, e.g., citronella, shown, by abstraction of the allylic proton, in an ene-like reaction, yielding the allyl hydroperoxide, R–O–OH (R = alkyl), which can then be reduced to the corresponding allylic alcohol.

In reactions with water, trioxidane, an unusual molecule with three consecutive linked oxygen atoms, is formed.

=== Analytical and physical chemistry ===
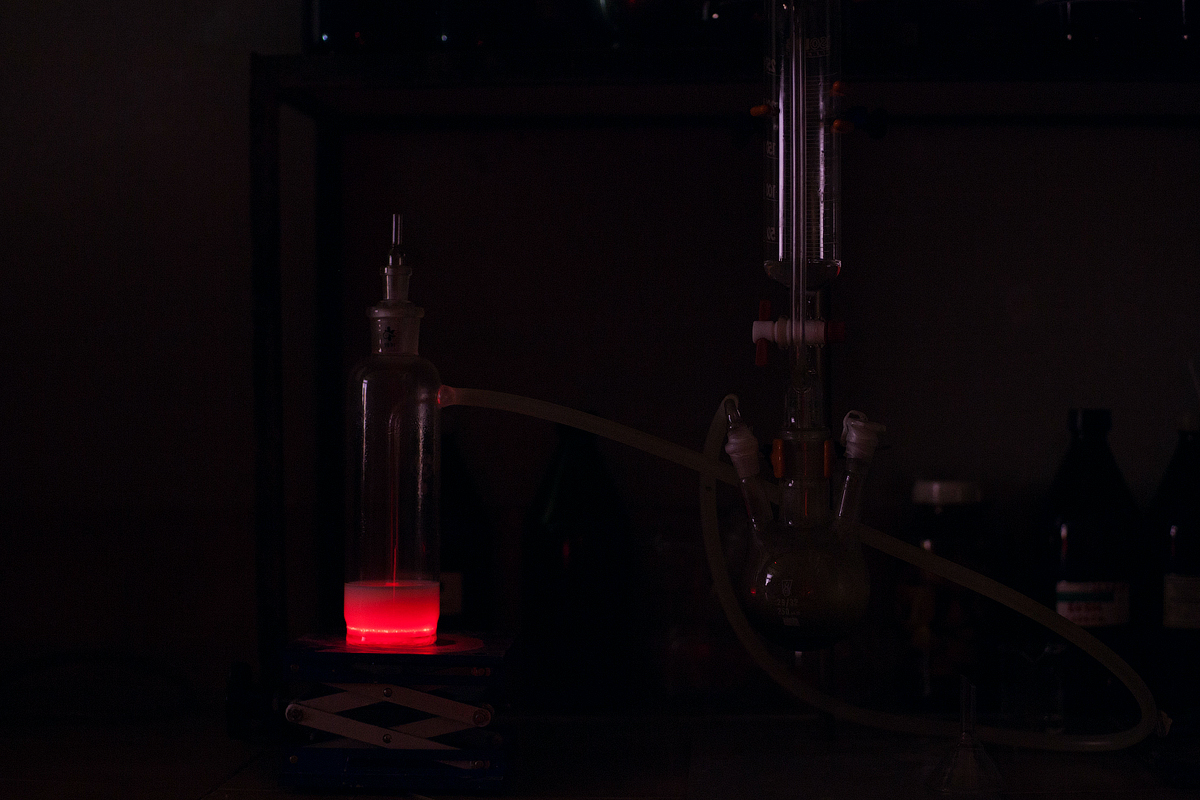
Red glow associated with decay of singlet oxygen to its triplet state.

Singlet oxygen luminesces concomitant with its decay to the triplet ground state. This phenomenon was first observed in the thermal degradation of the endo peroxide of rubrene.

== Biochemistry ==
In photosynthesis, singlet oxygen can be produced from the light-harvesting chlorophyll molecules. One of the roles of carotenoids in photosynthetic systems is to prevent damage caused by produced singlet oxygen by either removing excess light energy from chlorophyll molecules or quenching the singlet oxygen molecules directly.

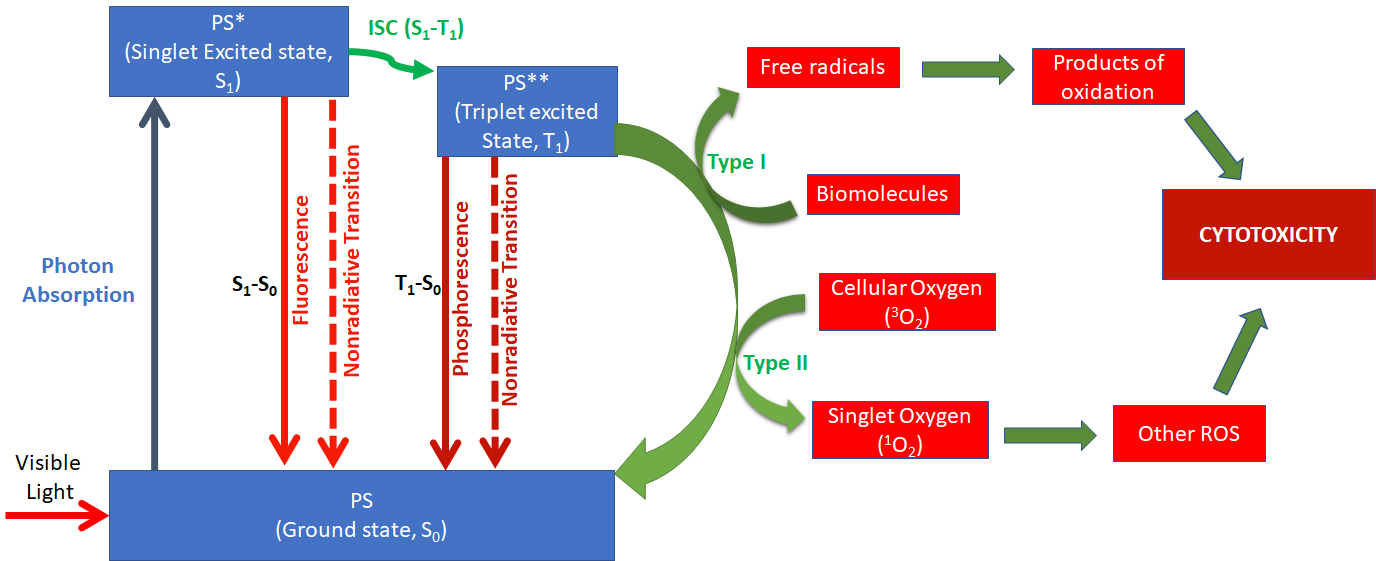
Modified Jablonski diagram showing the mechanism of photodynamic therapy

In mammalian biology, singlet oxygen is one of the reactive oxygen species, which is linked to oxidation of LDL cholesterol and resultant cardiovascular effects. Polyphenol antioxidants can scavenge and reduce concentrations of reactive oxygen species and may prevent such deleterious oxidative effects.

Ingestion of pigments capable of producing singlet oxygen with activation by light can produce severe photosensitivity of skin (see phototoxicity, photosensitivity in humans, photodermatitis, phytophotodermatitis). This is especially a concern in herbivorous animals (see photosensitivity in animals), and has been harnessed for medical uses in photodynamic therapy.
