= Doublet state =

State of a system in quantum mechanics

Examples of atoms in singlet, doublet, and triplet states.

In quantum mechanics, a doublet is a composite quantum state of a system with an effective spin of 1/ 2 , such that there are two allowed values of the spin component, − 1/ 2 and + 1/ 2 . Quantum systems with two possible states are sometimes called two-level systems. Essentially all occurrences of doublets in nature arise from rotational symmetry. Spin 1/ 2 is associated with the fundamental representation of the Lie group SU(2).

== History and applications ==
The term "doublet" dates back to the early 19th century, when it was observed that certain spectral lines of an ionized, excited gas would split into two under the influence of a strong magnetic field, in an effect known as the anomalous Zeeman effect. Such spectral lines were observed not only in the laboratory, but also in astronomical spectroscopy observations, allowing astronomers to deduce the existence of, and measure the strength of magnetic fields around the Sun, stars and galaxies. Conversely, it was the observation of doublets in spectroscopy that allowed physicists to deduce that the electron had a spin, and that furthermore, the magnitude of the spin had to be 1/ 2 . See the history section of the article on spin (physics) for greater detail.

Doublets continue to play an important role in physics. For example, the healthcare technology of magnetic resonance imaging is based on nuclear magnetic resonance. In this technology, a spectroscopic doublet occurs in a spin 1/ 2 atomic nucleus, whose doublet splitting is in the radio-frequency range. By applying both a magnetic field and carefully tuning a radio-frequency transmitter, the nuclear spins will flip and re-emit radiation, in an effect known as the Rabi cycle. The strength and frequency of the emitted radio waves allow the concentration of such nuclei to be measured. Another potential application is the use of doublets as the emitting layer in light-emitting diodes (LEDs). These materials have the advantage of having 100% theoretical quantum efficiency based on spin statistics whereas singlet systems and triplet systems have significantly lower efficiencies or rely on noble metals, such as platinum and iridium, to emit light.

== See also ==
- Singlet state
- Triplet state
- Spin multiplicity
