= Triplet state =

Quantum state of a system

Examples of atoms in singlet, doublet, and triplet states.

In quantum mechanics, a triplet state, or spin triplet, is the quantum state of an object such as an electron, atom, or molecule, having a quantum spin S = 1. It has three allowed values of the spin's projection along a given axis m_{S} = −1, 0, or +1, giving the name "triplet".

Spin, in the context of quantum mechanics, is not a mechanical rotation but a more abstract concept that characterizes a particle's intrinsic angular momentum. It is particularly important for systems at atomic length scales, such as individual atoms, protons, or electrons.

A triplet state occurs in cases where the spins of two unpaired electrons, each having spin s = 1/2, align to give S = 1, in contrast to the more common case of two electrons aligning oppositely to give S = 0, a spin singlet. Most molecules encountered in daily life exist in a singlet state because all of their electrons are paired, but molecular oxygen is an exception. At room temperature, O_{2} exists in a triplet state, which can only undergo a chemical reaction by making the forbidden transition into a singlet state. This makes it kinetically nonreactive despite being thermodynamically one of the strongest oxidants. Photochemical or thermal activation can bring it into the singlet state, which makes it kinetically as well as thermodynamically a very strong oxidant.

== Two spin-1/2 particles ==
In a system with two spin-1/2 particles – for example the proton and electron in the ground state of hydrogen – measured on a given axis, each particle can be either spin up or spin down so the system has four basis states in all

$$\uparrow\uparrow,\uparrow\downarrow,\downarrow\uparrow,\downarrow\downarrow$$

using the single particle spins to label the basis states, where the first arrow and second arrow in each combination indicate the spin direction of the first particle and second particle respectively.

More rigorously

$$|s_1,m_1\rangle|s_2,m_2\rangle = |s_1,m_1\rangle \otimes |s_2,m_2\rangle,$$

where $s_1$ and $s_2$ are the spins of the two particles, and $m_1$ and $m_2$ are their projections onto the z axis. Since for spin-1/2 particles, the $\left|\frac{1}{2},m\right\rangle$ basis states span a 2-dimensional space, the $\left|\frac{1}{2},m_1\right\rangle\left|\frac{1}{2},m_2\right\rangle$ basis states span a 4-dimensional space.

Now the total spin and its projection onto the previously defined axis can be computed using the rules for adding angular momentum in quantum mechanics using the Clebsch–Gordan coefficients. In general

$$|s,m\rangle = \sum_{m_1+m_2=m} C_{m_1m_2m}^{s_1s_2s}|s_1 m_1\rangle|s_2 m_2\rangle$$

substituting in the four basis states

$$\begin{align}
\left|\frac{1}{2},+\frac{1}{2}\right\rangle\ \otimes \left|\frac{1}{2},+\frac{1}{2}\right\rangle\ &\text{ by } (\uparrow\uparrow), \\
\left|\frac{1}{2},+\frac{1}{2}\right\rangle\ \otimes \left|\frac{1}{2},-\frac{1}{2}\right\rangle\ &\text{ by } (\uparrow\downarrow), \\
\left|\frac{1}{2},-\frac{1}{2}\right\rangle\ \otimes \left|\frac{1}{2},+\frac{1}{2}\right\rangle\ &\text{ by } (\downarrow\uparrow), \\
\left|\frac{1}{2},-\frac{1}{2}\right\rangle\ \otimes \left|\frac{1}{2},-\frac{1}{2}\right\rangle\ &\text{ by } (\downarrow\downarrow)\end{align}$$

returns the possible values for total spin given along with their representation in the $\left|\frac{1}{2},m_1\right\rangle\left|\frac{1}{2},m_2\right\rangle$ basis. There are three states with total spin angular momentum 1:

$$\left.\begin{array}{ll}
|1,1\rangle &=\; \uparrow\uparrow \\
|1,0\rangle &=\; \frac{1}{\sqrt{2}}(\uparrow\downarrow + \downarrow\uparrow) \\
|1,-1\rangle &=\; \downarrow\downarrow
\end{array}\right\}\quad s = 1\quad \mathrm{(triplet)}$$

which are symmetric and a fourth state with total spin angular momentum 0:

$$\left.|0,0\rangle = \frac{1}{\sqrt{2}}(\uparrow\downarrow - \downarrow\uparrow)\;\right\}\quad s=0\quad\mathrm{(singlet)}$$

which is antisymmetric. The result is that a combination of two spin-1/2 particles can carry a total spin of 1 or 0, depending on whether they occupy a triplet or singlet state.

== A mathematical viewpoint ==
In terms of representation theory, what has happened is that the two conjugate 2-dimensional spin representations of the spin group SU(2) = Spin(3) (as it sits inside the 3-dimensional Clifford algebra) have tensored to produce a 4-dimensional representation. The 4-dimensional representation descends to the usual orthogonal group SO(3) and so its objects are tensors, corresponding to the integrality of their spin. The 4-dimensional representation decomposes into the sum of a one-dimensional trivial representation (singlet, a scalar, spin zero) and a three-dimensional representation (triplet, spin 1) that is nothing more than the standard representation of SO(3) on $\R^3$. Thus the "three" in triplet can be identified with the three rotation axes of physical space.

== See also ==
- Singlet state
- Doublet state
- Diradical
- Helium atom
- Pauli matrices
- Spin isomers of hydrogen
- Spin multiplicity
- Spin quantum number
- Spin tensor
- Spinor
