= Singlet state =

Special low-energy state in quantum mechanics

Examples of atoms in singlet, doublet, and triplet states.

In quantum mechanics, a singlet state usually refers to a system in which all electrons are paired. The term "singlet" originally meant a linked set of particles whose net angular momentum is zero, that is, whose overall spin quantum number $s=0$. As a result, there is only one spectral line of a singlet state. In contrast, a doublet state contains one unpaired electron and shows splitting of spectral lines into a doublet, and a triplet state has two unpaired electrons and shows threefold splitting of spectral lines.

== History ==
Singlets and the related spin concepts of doublets and triplets occur frequently in atomic physics and nuclear physics, where one often needs to determine the total spin of a collection of particles. Since the only observed fundamental particle with zero spin is the extremely inaccessible Higgs boson, singlets in everyday physics are necessarily composed of sets of particles whose individual spins are non-zero, e.g. 1/2 or 1.

The origin of the term "singlet" is that bound quantum systems with zero net angular momentum emit photons within a single spectral line, as opposed to double lines (doublet state) or triple lines (triplet state). The number of spectral lines $n$ in this singlet-style terminology has a simple relationship to the spin quantum number: $n=2s+1$, and $s=(n-1)/2$.

Singlet-style terminology is also used for systems whose mathematical properties are similar or identical to angular momentum spin states, even when traditional spin is not involved. In particular, the concept of isospin was developed early in the history of particle physics to address the remarkable similarities of protons and neutrons. Within atomic nuclei, protons and neutrons behave in many ways as if they were a single type of particle, the nucleon, with two states. The proton-neutron pair thus by analogy was referred to as a doublet, and the hypothesized underlying nucleon was assigned a spin-like doublet quantum number $I_3=\tfrac{1}{2}$ to differentiate between those two states. Thus the neutron became a nucleon with isospin $I_3(n)=-\tfrac{1}{2}$, and the proton a nucleon with $I_3(p)=+\tfrac{1}{2}$. The isospin doublet notably shares the same SU(2) mathematical structure as the $s=\tfrac{1}{2}$ angular momentum doublet. It should be mentioned that this early particle physics focus on nucleons was subsequently replaced by the more fundamental quark model, in which protons and neutrons are interpreted as bound systems of three quarks each. The isospin analogy also applies to quarks, and is the source of the names up (as in "isospin up") and down (as in "isospin down") for the quarks found in protons and neutrons.

While for angular momentum states the singlet-style terminology is seldom used beyond triplets (spin=1), it has proven historically useful for describing much larger particle groups and subgroups that share certain features and are distinguished from each other by quantum numbers beyond spin. An example of this broader use of singlet-style terminology is the nine-member "nonet" of the pseudoscalar mesons.

== Examples ==
The simplest possible angular momentum singlet is a set (bound or unbound) of two spin-1/2 (fermion) particles that are oriented so that their spin directions ("up" and "down") oppose each other; that is, they are antiparallel.

The simplest possible bound particle pair capable of exhibiting the singlet state is positronium, which consists of an electron and positron (antielectron) bound by their opposite electric charges. The electron and positron in positronium can also have identical or parallel spin orientations, which results in an experimentally-distinct form of positronium with a spin 1 or triplet state.

An unbound singlet consists of a pair of entities small enough to exhibit quantum behavior (e.g. particles, atoms, or small molecules), not necessarily of the same type, for which four conditions hold:

1. The spins of the two entities are of equal magnitude.
2. The current spin values of both entities originated within a single well-defined quantum event (wave function) at some earlier location in classical space and time.
3. The originating wave function relates the two entities in such a way that their net angular momentum must be zero, which in turn means that if and when they are detected experimentally, conservation of angular momentum will require their spins to be in full opposition (antiparallel).
4. Their spin states have remained unperturbed since the originating quantum event – which is equivalent to asserting that there exists no classical information (observation) of their status anywhere within the universe.

Any spin value can be used for the pair, but the entanglement effect will be strongest both mathematically and experimentally if the spin magnitude is as small as possible, with the maximum possible effect occurring for entities with spin-1/2 (such as electrons and positrons). Early thought experiments for unbound singlets usually assumed the use of two antiparallel spin-1/2 electrons. However, actual experiments have tended to focus instead on using pairs of spin 1 photons. While the entanglement effect is somewhat less pronounced with such spin 1 particles, photons are easier to generate in correlated pairs and (usually) easier to keep in an unperturbed quantum state.

== Mathematical representations ==
The ability of positronium to form both singlet and triplet states is described mathematically by saying that the product of two doublet representations (meaning the electron and positron, which are both spin-1/2 doublets) can be decomposed into the sum of an adjoint representation (the triplet or spin 1 state) and a trivial representation (the singlet or spin 0 state). While the particle interpretation of the positronium triplet and singlet states is arguably more intuitive, the mathematical description enables precise calculations of quantum states and probabilities.

This greater mathematical precision for example makes it possible to assess how singlets and doublets behave under rotation operations. Since a spin-1/2 electron transforms as a doublet under rotation, its experimental response to rotation can be predicted by using the fundamental representation of that doublet, specifically the Lie group SU(2). Applying the operator $\vec{S}^2$ to the spin state of the electron thus will always result in $\hbar^2 \left(\frac{1}{2}\right) \left(\frac{1}{2} + 1\right) = \left(\frac{3}{4}\right) \hbar^2$, or spin-1/2, since the spin-up and spin-down states are both eigenstates of the operator with the same eigenvalue.

Similarly, for a system of two electrons, it is possible to measure the total spin by applying $\left(\vec{S}_1 + \vec{S}_2\right)^2$, where $\vec{S}_1$ acts on electron 1 and $\vec{S}_2$ acts on electron 2. Since this system has two possible spins, it also has two possible eigenvalues and corresponding eigenstates for the total spin operator, corresponding to the spin 0 and spin 1 states.

== Singlets and entangled states ==
Particles in singlet states do not need to be locally bound to each other. For example, when the spin states of two electrons are correlated by their emission from a single quantum event that conserves angular momentum, the resulting electrons remain in a shared singlet state even as their separation in space increases indefinitely over time, provided only that their angular momentum states remain unperturbed. In Dirac notation this distance-indifferent singlet state is usually represented as:

$$|\Psi_{\rm singlet}\rangle=\frac{1}{\sqrt{2}}\left( \left|\uparrow \downarrow \right\rangle -  \left|\downarrow \uparrow \right\rangle\right).$$

The possibility of spatially extended unbound singlet states has considerable historical and even philosophical importance, since considering such states contributed importantly to the theoretical and experimental exploration and verification of what is now called quantum entanglement. Along with Podolsky and Rosen, Einstein proposed the EPR paradox thought experiment to help define his concerns with what he viewed as the non-locality of spatially separated entangled particles, using it in an argument that quantum mechanics was incomplete. In 1951 David Bohm formulated a version of the "paradox" using spin singlet states.

The difficulty captured by the EPR-Bohm thought experiment was that by measuring a spatial component of the angular momentum of either of two particles that have been prepared in a spatially distributed singlet state, the quantum state of the remaining particle, conditioned on the measurement result obtained, appears to be "instantaneously" altered, even if the two particles have over time become separated by light years of distance. Decades later, John Stewart Bell, who was a strong advocate of Einstein's locality-first perspective, proved Bell's theorem and showed that it could be used to assess the existence or non-existence of singlet entanglement experimentally. The irony was that instead of disproving entanglement, which was Bell's hope, subsequent experiments instead established the reality of entanglement. In fact, there now exist commercial quantum encryption devices whose operation depends fundamentally on the existence and behavior of spatially extended singlets.

A weaker form of Einstein's locality principle remains intact, which is this: Classical information cannot be transmitted faster than the speed of light c, not even by using quantum entanglement events. This form of locality is weaker than the notion of "Einstein locality" or "local realism" used in the EPR and Bell's Theorem papers, but is sufficient to prevent the emergence of causality paradoxes.

== SU(2) singlet states of many particles ==
In the multi-particle case, we have to consider the collective angular momentum operator for the $N$-particle state

$$J_l=\sum_{n=1}^N j_l^{(n)}$$

for $l=x,y,z.$ For the multi-particle singlet states

$$\langle J_l^2 \rangle=0$$

holds for $l=x,y,z.$ Thus, all the three collective spin components have a zero expectation value with a zero variance. A simple example is the tensor product of the two-qubit singlets

$$|\Psi_{\rm singlet}\rangle^{\otimes \frac{N}{2}},$$

where $N$ is even. The ground state of the antiferromagnetic Heisenberg chain is also a singlet state. For $N$ qubits, for even $N$, there is a single permutationally invariant singlet.

== SU(d) singlet states of many particles ==
For the case of $d$-dimensional particles, we can define the $d^2-1$ SU(d) generators fulfilling the relations

$${\rm Tr}(g_k g_l)=2\delta_{kl}.$$

Then, we can define the collective observables

$$G_k=\sum_{n=1}^N g_k^{(n)}$$

for $k=1,2,...,d^2-1.$ For SU(d) singlets

$$\langle G_k^2\rangle=0$$

holds. Thus, all $G_k$ have a zero expectation value with a zero variance. For the case of $N=d$, there is such a SU(d) singlet state $\vert \Psi_{\rm SU(d)\;singlet}\rangle.$ For the case of $N=nd$, where $n$ is a positive integer, $\vert \Psi_{\rm SU(d)\;singlet}\rangle^{\otimes n}$ is such a singlet state.

== Entanglement detection ==
It is possible to detect entanglement in the vicinity of SU(2)-singlet states with collective measurements. For separable states of $N$ spin-$j$ particles

$$(\Delta J_x)^2+(\Delta J_y)^2+(\Delta J_z)^2\ge N j$$

holds. For a singlet the left-hand side is zero. Any state that violates the above inequality is entangled. The above entanglement condition can be rewritten with the magnetic susceptibilities, and thus can be used to detect entanglement in solid state systems.

It is also possible to detect entanglement in the vicinity of SU(d)-singlet states with collective measurements. For separable states of $N$ $d$-state particles

$$\sum_{k=1}^{d^2-1} (\Delta G_l)^2 \ge 2N(d-1)$$

holds. For an SU(d) singlet the left-hand side is zero. Any state that violates the above inequality is entangled.

== Experimental realization ==
Spontaneous parametric down-conversion have been used to create two-qubit singlets in photons, where the horizontal and vertical polzarizations are used to encode the 0 and 1. Four-qubit singlets have been realized in photons. Singlet states have been realzied with $10^5$ polarization entangled photons. Parametric down-conversion is proposed to realize bipartite singlets of many photons.

Multiparticle singlets, as well as a dimerized phase of two-body singlets appear in antiferromagnatic models in optical lattices of cold spin-1 bosonic particles. Singlet states have been realized in cold gases with spin-squeezing techniques.

== Applications ==
Two-qubit singlet states can be used in quantum cryptography and quantum teleportation. SU(d) singlets can be used for problems that have no classical solution: The 'N strangers,' 'secret sharing,' and 'liar detection' problems. Many-body singlet states are invariant under the influence of homogeneoues magnetic fields, thus they can be used for gradient metrology.

== See also ==
- Helium atom
- Singlet oxygen
- Spin isomers of hydrogen
- Spin multiplicity
