= Vincenzo Casciarolo =

Italian alchemist

- Born: 1571; Bologna
- Died: 1624; Bologna
- Known for: synthesizing Barium sulphate

Vincenzo Casciarolo (1571–1624), also known as Vincentius Casciorolus, was an Italian alchemist and shoemaker from Bologna whose primary achievement was synthesizing Barium sulfide (BaS) in 1602 or 1604, the first naturally luminescent compound known to European scholars.

== Biography ==
Apart from probably being born in 1571 and passing in 1624 in Bologna, very little is known about Casciarolo's life. According to contemporary accounts, Casciarolo was of humble origin and took a special interest in metals, minerals and alchemical manipulations.

Casciarolo has been first mentioned by his name in the collection of letters discussing the Bologna Stone that was published by Ovidio Montalbani in 1634 and titled De illuminabili lapide Bononiensi, epistolae familiares duae.

== Discovery of the Bologna Stone ==
In 1602 (or 1604) Casciarolo found a heavy oddly looking rock on Monte Paderno, a mountain several kilometers away from Bologna. With a view at extracting a metal from the sample, Casciarolo brought it home and calcinated the material in a furnace. What resulted was a rock that glowed in the dark for an extended period of time after exposure to sunlight. Casciarolo called the rock spongia solis (Latin for “sun sponge”; spugna di sole) since he thought the effect was due to the rock absorbing the sunlight.

== Commemoration ==
A street in Bologna's San Donato quarter that spans between Via Ruggero Ruggeri and Via Bruno Lanzarini was named in honor of Vincenzo Casciarolo (Via Vincenzo Casciarolo) on February 10, 1967.

== Sources ==
- Gliozzi, Mario (1978). "Casciarolo, Vincenzo". Dizionario Biografico degli Italiani (in Italian). Vol. 21: Caruso–Castelnuovo. Rome: Istituto dell'Enciclopedia Italiana. ISBN 978-88-12-00032-6.
- Principe, Lawrence M. (2016). "Chymical Exotica in the Seventeenth Century, or, How to Make the Bologna Stone". Ambix. 63 (2): 118–144. doi:10.1080/00026980.2016.1213011.
