= Freek J. Beekman =

Dutch inventor and Professor of Applied Physics

Frederik (Freek) J. Beekman is a Dutch inventor, entrepreneur and Professor of Applied Physics at Delft University of Technology, mainly known for his work in the field of tomographic image reconstruction and molecular imaging systems.

== Life and work ==
Born in Markelo, Beekman studied Experimental Physics at Radboud University Nijmegen from 1986 to 1991. In 1992 he started his PhD at Utrecht University, graduating in 1995 with his thesis, entitled "Fully 3D reconstruction of SPECT using object shape-dependent scatter models."

From 1995 until 2008 he was appointed as a Physicist at the Image Sciences Institute and Department of Nuclear Medicine, University Medical Centre Utrecht, rising to the post of associate professor in 2002. In 2007 he has been appointed full professor of Applied Physics at Delft University of Technology to head the Radiation, Detection & Medical Imaging section. The main activities of this section involve research on radiation detection, x-ray & molecular imaging, image reconstruction and radiation therapy.

In 2006 he founded MILabs B.V., a molecular imaging spin-off from the University Medical Centre Utrecht, the Netherlands that utilises Beekman's inventions on high-resolution PET and SPECT to produce high-resolution multi-modal and stand-alone scanners for mice and men.

After he sold MIlabs to Rigaku in 2021 (9,10) he left MILabs. In 2023 he started The Molecular Imaging Foundation as well as a new company (Free Bee Int’l) that is currently focusing on innovating nuclear imaging technologies.

== Selected awards and honours ==
- In 2013, Beekman received the FOM Valorisation Award
- In 2017 the Edward Hoffman Memorial Award from the Society of Nuclear Medicine and Molecular Imaging.
- In both 2015 and 2018, Beekman and his team received the Commercial Innovation of the Year Award of the World Molecular Imaging Society.
- Fellow of the World Molecular Imaging Society since 2024
