= Hyperpolarization =

Hyperpolarization has several meanings:

- Hyperpolarization (biology) occurs when the strength of the electric field across the width of a cell membrane increases
- Hyperpolarization (physics) is the selective polarization of nuclear spin in atoms far beyond normal thermal equilibrium
