= Hyperpolarized gas MRI =

Medical imaging technique

Hyperpolarized gas MRI, also known as hyperpolarized helium-3 MRI or HPHe-3 MRI, is a medical imaging technique that uses hyperpolarized gases to improve the sensitivity and spatial resolution of magnetic resonance imaging (MRI). This technique has many potential applications in medicine, including the imaging of the lungs and other areas of the body with low tissue density.

The current standard for diagnosing and monitoring treatment of pulmonary diseases is spirometric pulmonary function testing (PFTs). However, these tests only assess the lung on a global basis and are generally not sensitive enough to detect functional changes in the small airways and gas exchange regions. This lack of sensitivity has led these regions to be known as the "silent zone." Additionally, PFT metrics largely rely on the effort of the subject, leading to significant measurement uncertainty and variability. As a result, current therapy is largely based on patients' symptoms and survival. Given the high burden on the healthcare system and the increasing prevalence of pulmonary disease, there is a need for improved diagnostic tools and quantitative metrics to better diagnose and quantify pulmonary disease progression and accurately measure response to therapy.

The basic principle of hyperpolarized gas MRI is similar to that of conventional MRI, which uses powerful magnetic fields and radio waves to create detailed images of the body's internal structures. In conventional MRI, the magnetic moments of hydrogen atoms (protons) in the body's water and fat molecules are aligned with the magnetic field and then subjected to a radiofrequency pulse. This causes the protons to absorb energy and become excited, and when the radiofrequency pulse is turned off, the protons relax and release their energy in the form of a detectable signal. This signal is used to construct an image of the body's tissues.

== Overcoming challenges of traditional MRI ==
Traditional MR imaging of the lungs is difficult because conventional scanners are designed to excite hydrogen protons, which are present in water molecules. However, the lungs have only a very low density of hydrogen protons compared to other structures, and their long relaxation time means that the signal available for imaging is minimal. In addition, the inhomogeneous magnetic environment of the lungs introduces susceptibility artifacts that further complicate MR acquisitions. These challenges are not faced by external gaseous contrast media like ^{3}He or ^{129}Xe, which image the airways and airspaces within the lungs rather than the surrounding tissues. This greatly reduces the problems of unfavorable longitudinal and transverse relaxation times faced by hydrogen MRIs in the lung. However, MR imaging of a gas is challenging because its density is typically about 4 orders of magnitude lower than that of protons. To overcome this limitation, a process called hyperpolarization is used to increase the magnetization of these gases by about 5 orders of magnitude. This makes MR-based imaging of inhaled gases feasible within a single breath hold.

To improve the ability to detect early lung disease, it is necessary to use imaging techniques that provide regional information. Hyperpolarized gas magnetic resonance imaging (HP gas MRI) is a non-invasive, radiation-free method that can image the structure and function of the lungs. While ^{3}He was originally used extensively in HP gas MRI, its recent scarcity and increase in price has led to a shift towards the cheaper and more abundant ^{129}Xe. The advantage of using ^{129}Xe is that it is soluble in pulmonary tissues, providing two additional signal sources in addition to the xenon in the airspaces. These three ^{129}Xe resonances can provide quantitative regional information about the fundamental function of the lungs: gas exchange.

== History and safety ==
In 1994, the first studies on hyperpolarized (HP) gas magnetic resonance imaging (MRI) were carried out using the noble gas isotope Xenon-129 (^{129}Xe). In 1997, Mugler and colleagues used ^{129}Xe to conduct the first studies in humans. However, these studies were limited by relatively low ^{129}Xe polarizations (1-2%), which resulted in low signal intensities. This issue led to a shift in research interest to helium-3 (^{3}He), which has a larger gyromagnetic ratio than ^{129}Xe and offers a simpler and more mature polarization technology (30%) and corresponding larger signal intensities. ^{3}He also does not have any physiological side effects, making it a better starting point for clinical imaging.

In 1996, ^{3}He MR imaging entered clinical research and expanded to multi-center clinical studies. The results of the ventilation studies showed a significant correlation to conventional pulmonary function tests in patients with chronic obstructive pulmonary disease, asthma, and cystic fibrosis. The main problem with ^{3}He HP MR imaging is the limited supply of ^{3}He, which comes from the decay of tritium, a byproduct of nuclear weapons production. This has driven up costs significantly to around $800–2000 per liter depending on academic versus commercial use. Due to these higher costs and lower availability, ^{3}He HP MR imaging is not economically sustainable.

Recent advances in ^{129}Xe polarization technology have led to the reintroduction of ^{129}Xe MR imaging in humans. Xenon has a long history of safe use as a contrast agent in computed tomography lung imaging studies, which was confirmed in safety studies on inhaling hyperpolarized ^{129}Xe. With the development of more efficient polarizers, resulting in improved ^{129}Xe polarization, it is expected that better image quality can be achieved with a lower volume of xenon. A second safety study showed that inhalation of only 0.5-liter volumes caused subjects to experience few or no symptoms.

== Physics of hyperpolarization ==
The basic principle of hyperpolarized gas MRI is similar to that of conventional MRI, which uses powerful magnetic fields and radio waves to create detailed images of the body's internal structures. In conventional MRI, the magnetic moments of hydrogen atoms (protons) in the body's water and fat molecules are aligned with the magnetic field and then subjected to a radiofrequency pulse. This causes the protons to absorb energy and become excited, and when the radiofrequency pulse is turned off, the protons relax and release their energy in the form of a detectable signal. This signal is used to construct an image of the body's tissues.

In hyperpolarized gas MRI, the gases used are noble gases, such as ^{3}He or ^{129}Xe, which have large nuclear magnetic moments but low natural abundance and therefore produce very weak signals. To increase the nuclear spin polarization of either ^{3}He or ^{129}Xe, two processes are involved: 1) optical pumping and 2) spin exchange.

Hyperpolarized gas MRI is a technique that uses the alignment of nuclear spins in certain gases, such as ^{3}He or ^{129}Xe, to create detailed images of the body's internal structures. In order for the nuclear spins to be used for imaging, they must be aligned in the same direction, or polarized. Under normal conditions, the nuclear spins within the gas volume are randomly aligned, leading to a zero signal.

Once the nuclear spins have been polarized, they can be placed in a large magnetic field, such as that of a 1.5T or 3.0T scanner. This will cause slightly more spins to align with the field than against it. However, this difference is not sufficient for imaging dilute gases like ^{3}He or ^{129}Xe. Therefore, hyperpolarization techniques are used to add angular momentum to the system and align all of the nuclear spins in the same direction, resulting in a strong signal that can be used to create detailed images of the body's tissues.

=== Optical pumping ===
Hyperpolarization is the process of aligning the nuclear spins in a gas, such as ^{3}He or ^{129}Xe, in the same direction to create a strong signal for imaging. To accomplish this, angular momentum is added to the system through the use of circularly polarized laser light. Since nuclei cannot directly absorb laser light, an intermediary is used to absorb the light and transfer its angular momentum to the nuclei.

This intermediary is typically an alkali metal atom, such as rubidium, whose outer-shell valence electron is aligned by the laser light. Only atoms with electron spins that are down can absorb the light, so illuminating the alkali vapor with circularly polarized resonant light will convert the entire sample to the spin up direction. Once a valence electron spin has been flipped up, it remains aligned until collisions cause it to depolarize. However, it can simply absorb another photon and return to the aligned state. This process, known as optical pumping, allows for the efficient alignment of nuclear spins in the gas.

=== Spin exchange ===
The alignment of the valence electron is then transferred to the noble-gas nuclei through collisions with polarized electron spins of the rubidium. This process is called spin exchange. The rubidium electrons are then aligned again by absorbing additional laser light and continue to build polarization in the noble-gas nuclei. Current techniques using optical pumping and spin exchange can achieve polarizations of around 40-80% for ^{3}He and 10-40% for ^{129}Xe. Recently, very high peak polarization levels for ^{129}Xe have been demonstrated in diluted mixtures.

=== Mechanism of hyperpolarization ===
The process of optical pumping uses rubidium (Rb) contained in a glass optical cell. This cell is placed in an oven with two Helmholtz coils that generate a small, but homogenous 20 G magnetic field. The Rb is heated to around 150 °C to produce a vapor pressure of about 1ppm of the total gas density in the cell. Circularly polarized laser light is then directed at the cell, which is tuned to the D1 transition of rubidium. This light is absorbed by the Rb vapor, polarizing the valence electron spins on the Rb atoms.

Spin exchange is a process that begins when a mixture of 1% ^{129}Xe, 89% ^{4}He and 10% N_{2} is directed to flow through an optical cell that contains optically pumped Rubidium (Rb) atoms. The buffer gases, helium and nitrogen, serve to broaden the Rb absorption cross section, allowing a large fraction of laser light to be absorbed and used to polarize the valence electron spins of the Rb atoms. Through a combination of binary collisions and the formation of transient Van der Waals complexes, the electron spin polarization is transferred to the ^{129}Xe nuclei. The gas flow rate is regulated to ensure that the ^{129}Xe emerges from the cell with a high level of polarization. To separate the ^{129}Xe from the helium and nitrogen, it is cryogenically accumulated in a cold finger immersed in liquid nitrogen. Since xenon has a higher freezing point than the other gases, it is frozen out and separated from them. Once a sufficient amount of xenon has been accumulated, it is thawed and dispensed into a perfluoropolymer bag. The xenon polarization is then measured using a low-field NMR-based system and delivered to the patient for use in MRI imaging. Commercially available systems can produce liters of xenon polarized to 10-15% within an hour. Advances in polarization physics are expected to improve both the production rate and polarization of ^{129}Xe in the future.

In order to obtain images of the subject's lung tissue, the polarized xenon gas is inhaled through a tube connected to a mouthpiece. The subject is instructed to take a deep breath and exhale fully twice before inhaling the gas. The typical scan uses a mixture of 200-1000 ml of 129Xe and a buffer gas such as helium or nitrogen. This mixture is inhaled by the subject and used to create detailed images of the lung tissue.

== Applications ==
=== Ventilation imaging ===
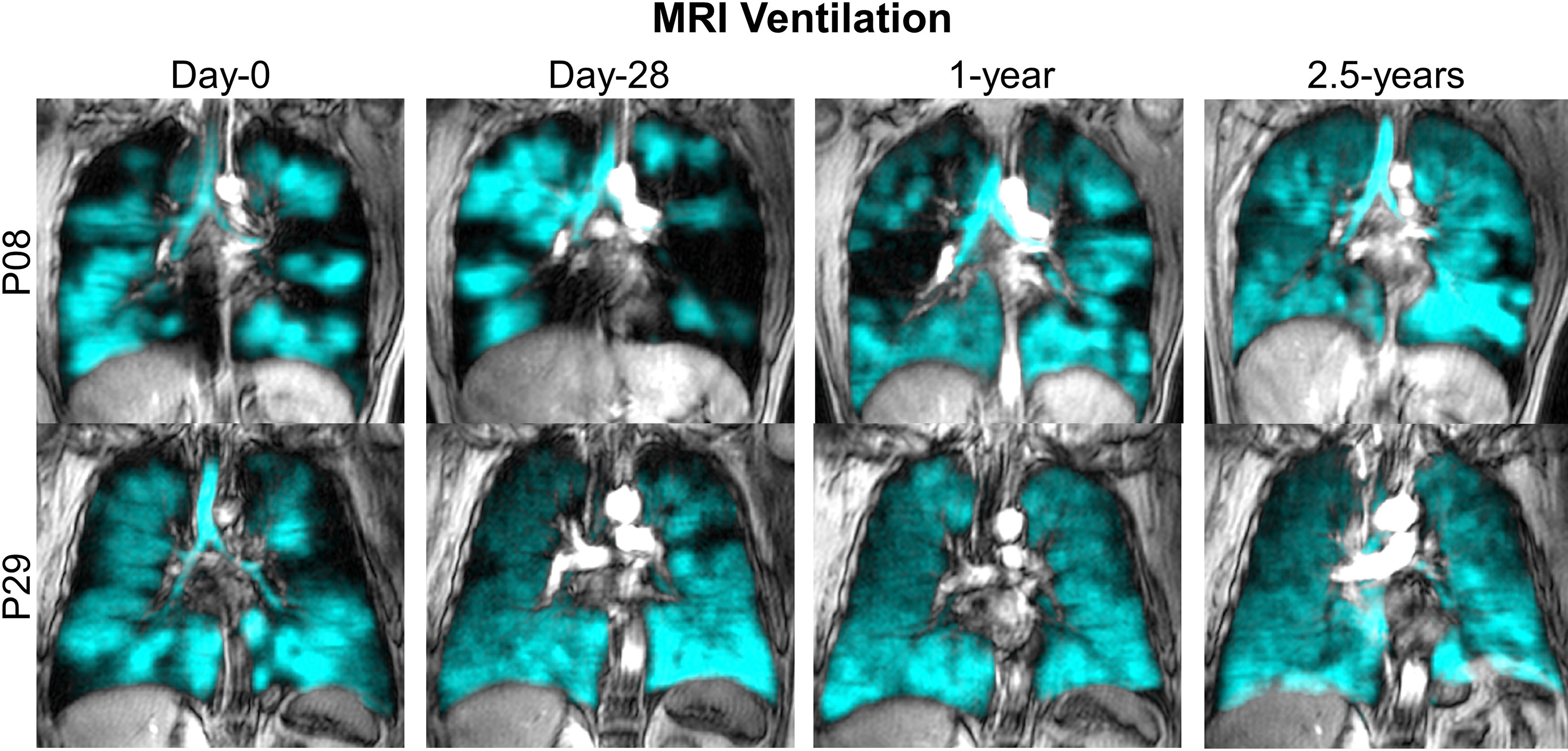
MRI with inhaled Xe-129 shows improved ventilation over time. H(grayscale)+129Xe MRI (cyan) slices at day 0, day 28, 1-y and 2.5-y follow-up, Anti-IL-5Rα (benralizumab)-treated Eosinophilic Asthma

HP ^{3}He gas MR imaging of the lungs has been confirmed to be effective in multiple clinical studies since 1997. This technique is mainly used to create images of gas distribution in the lungs, allowing for the identification of ventilation defects. These defects can be caused by blocked airways or destruction of lung tissue. The MR signal intensities in the ventilation images can be grouped into four clusters for analysis. Low or absent signal within the lungs corresponds well with ventilation defects and allows for the detection and quantification of functional ventilation impairment in conditions such as asthma, COPD, and cystic fibrosis. Data acquisition for this technique is completed in a single breath-hold, providing static ventilation information. Dynamic ventilation properties, such as gas flow, are more difficult to measure but progress has been made in this area.

Traditionally, HP 3He provided better image quality due to its larger polarization compared to 129Xe. However, recent improvements in polarization technology and MR acquisition have allowed 129Xe to produce images of similar quality to 3He. In terms of detecting ventilation defects, ^{129}Xe has a lower signal-to-noise ratio but is more sensitive to defects due to its higher density and lower diffusivity. Currently, using a larger volume of ^{129}Xe (up to 1 liter per scan) can compensate for its decreased signal-to-noise ratio compared to 3He (usually 0.1-0.3 liters per scan).

=== Diffusion weighted imaging ===
Diffusion-weighted MRI has been proven effective and is commonly used with hyperpolarized gases to calculate the apparent diffusion coefficient (ADC) of the gas. This is done by taking gas images with and without diffusion sensitizing gradients. The usefulness of this contrast comes from the fact that the diffusion of gases is limited by the structure of healthy lungs. In diseases like emphysema, where the airspaces are larger, the gases are free to diffuse more easily. This allows diffusion-weighting to differentiate normal airspaces from enlarged ones based on the degree of signal attenuation. The signal intensities in the weighted and non-weighted images are then used to calculate the ADC on a voxel-by-voxel basis. ADC maps show low values in healthy lung tissue, but in emphysematous lungs, elevated ADC values are often seen. In addition to showing emphysema, ^{3}He or ^{129}Xe ADC values have been found to be sensitive to early changes in the lung tissue of smokers and people exposed to second-hand smoke. ADC MRI has also been shown to be sensitive to age-related changes in alveolar size in healthy individuals. Comparisons to CT densitometry have shown that ADC strongly correlates with DLCO and may be able to detect early emphysema before it is visible on CT scans. While most ADC imaging has used ^{3}He MRI, it has recently been shown that ^{129}Xe can also be used for this purpose.

== Future direction ==
=== ^{129}Xe dissolving imaging ===
Xenon has a lower gyromagnetic ratio and lower SNR in images than helium. However, it has the useful property of being moderately soluble in lung tissue. This allows it to diffuse into the capillaries and blood stream, where it experiences shifts in frequency that provide information about gas exchange in the lungs. These shifts can be used to study ventilatory distribution and diffusive gas exchange.

Imaging the dissolved-phase of gases in the lungs can be difficult. The signal intensity in this phase is only 2% of the gas-phase, and its T2* is very fast at 2 ms. Additionally, the dissolved-phase resonances are 200 ppm from the gas-phase on a 1.5T scanner, so RF excitation pulses must be carefully tuned to avoid exciting the gas-phase.

Early attempts at imaging the dissolved-phase used indirect methods like Xenon Polarization Transfer Contrast (XTC). This method used RF pulses applied to the dissolved-phase to slightly attenuate the gas-phase signal, allowing for the indirect mapping of the dissolved-phase distribution. As polarization and pulse sequence technology improved, direct imaging of dissolved ^{129}Xe became possible. By using frequency-selective RF pulses and a 3D radial pulse sequence, the first direct images of the dissolved-phase in humans were acquired in 2010. These images were lower resolution due to the small signal intensity of dissolved-phase ^{129}Xe, but still showed interesting aspects of lung function. Soon after this technique was introduced, Mugler et al. showed the value of acquiring the gas-phase distribution in the same breath, allowing for the quantification of the dissolved-phase distribution. This was later extended to a radial acquisition strategy, which allowed for the analysis of the effects of posture on gas transfer.

It is important to be able to separately detect the transfer of ^{129}Xe to red blood cells (RBCs) because the pathway xenon follows to reach RBCs is the same as that of oxygen. Recently, spectra of ^{129}Xe in the dissolved phase were acquired in subjects with idiopathic pulmonary fibrosis and showed greatly reduced ^{129}Xe transfer to RBCs compared to healthy volunteers. This work showed that separating the dissolved ^{129}Xe resonances is critical for detecting diffusion limitation caused by lung tissue thickening. ^{129}Xe measurements correlated strongly with DLCO and showed that the frequency of the ^{129}Xe RBC resonance may be a sensitive measure of blood oxygenation at the capillary level. This work also emphasized the need for imaging to separately detect xenon uptake in barrier tissues and RBCs.

Separately imaging ^{129}Xe in barrier tissues and RBCs is similar to separating fat and water in 1H MRI. The two resonances are similarly spaced, so fat-water separation algorithms can be used. Qing et al. used the Hierarchical IDEAL algorithm to image all three resonances of xenon in a single breath. The 1-point Dixon strategy has also been successful and may be more robust against the short T2* of the dissolved-phase ^{129}Xe signal. This technique was also recently used to image all three resonances of xenon in a single breath.

== See also ==
- Xenon gas MRI
