= Michèle Leduc =

French physicist

Michèle Leduc (born 1942) is a retired French physicist known for her research on the development of infrared lasers, their application in optical pumping and hyperpolarized gas MRI, and for leading early observations of Bose–Einstein condensates of helium. She is an emerita director of research for the French National Centre for Scientific Research (CNRS), affiliated with the Bose–Einstein condensate team of the Kastler–Brossel Laboratory of CNRS and the École normale supérieure (Paris), and a former president of the Société Française de Physique.

== Education and career ==
Leduc became a student at the École normale supérieure de jeunes filles in 1961, and received an agrégation in physical sciences in 1965. She completed a doctorat d'état in 1972, through the University of Paris.

She joined the CNRS in 1969, as a researcher in the Laboratoire de spectroscopie hertzienne, which later became the Kastler–Brossel Laboratory. She became part of a group with Claude Cohen-Tannoudji studying ultracold atoms in the 1990s; Cohen-Tannoudji received the Nobel prize in 1997 for his group's research. In 2001, a team led by Leduc and Cohen-Tannoudji became one of two groups to make the first observations of helium Bose–Einstein condensates.

She directed the Center for Physics of the Les Houches School of Physics from 1993 to 1998, and directed the Kastler–Brossel Laboratory from 1994 to 1999. By 2005, she had become a director of research (exceptional class) for the CNRS. She retired as a director of research emerita in 2007.

From 2007 to 2008, and again for an interim term in 2009, she was president of the Société Française de Physique. She directed the Institut francilien de recherche sur les atomes froids from 2005 to 2012, and chaired the ethics committee of the CNRS from 2012 to 2016.

== Recognition ==
Leduc received the Prix Paul Doistau–Émile Blutet in the physical sciences in 1976. She was the 1989 recipient of the Prix Science et Défense of the Direction générale de l'armement, and one of four 1998 recipients of the Körber European Science Prize. In 2009, she received the Irène Joliot-Curie Prize as female scientist of the year.

She was named as a knight in the Ordre des Arts et des Lettres in 1987, as a commander in the Ordre national du Mérite in 2010, and as a commander in the Legion of Honour in 2014.
