= Spin isomers of hydrogen =

Spin states of hydrogen

Spin isomers of molecular hydrogen

Molecular hydrogen occurs in two nuclear isomeric forms, orthohydrogen with the nuclear spins of its two protons aligned parallel to each other, and parahydrogen with its two proton spins aligned antiparallel. These two forms can be called spin isomers or more specifically nuclear spin isomers.

Parahydrogen is in a lower energy state than orthohydrogen. At room temperature and thermal equilibrium, thermal excitation causes hydrogen to consist of approximately 75% orthohydrogen and 25% parahydrogen. When hydrogen is liquified at low temperature, there is a slow spontaneous transition to a predominantly para ratio, with the released energy having implications for storage. Essentially pure parahydrogen form can be obtained at very low temperatures, but it is not possible to obtain a sample containing more than 75% orthohydrogen by heating.

A 50:50 mixture of ortho- and parahydrogen can be made in the laboratory by passing it over an iron(III) oxide catalyst at liquid nitrogen temperature (77 K) or by storing hydrogen at 77 K for 2–3 hours in the presence of activated charcoal. In the absence of a catalyst, gas phase parahydrogen takes days to relax to normal hydrogen at room temperature while it takes hours to do so in organic solvents.

== Nuclear spin states of H_{2} ==
Each hydrogen molecule (H_{2}) consists of two hydrogen atoms linked by a covalent bond. If we neglect the small proportion of deuterium and tritium which may be present, each hydrogen atom consists of one proton and one electron. Each proton has an associated magnetic moment, which is associated with the proton's spin of 1/2. In the H_{2} molecule, the spins of the two hydrogen nuclei (protons) couple to form a triplet state known as orthohydrogen, and a singlet state known as parahydrogen.

The triplet orthohydrogen state has total nuclear spin I = 1 so that the component along a defined axis can have the three values M_{I} = 1, 0, or −1. The corresponding nuclear spin wavefunctions are $\left|\uparrow \uparrow \right\rangle$, $\textstyle\frac{1}{\sqrt{2}}(\left|\uparrow \downarrow \right\rangle + \left|\downarrow \uparrow \right\rangle)$ and $\left|\downarrow \downarrow \right\rangle$. This formalism uses standard bra–ket notation; the symbol ↑ represents the spin-up wavefunction and the symbol ↓ the spin-down wavefunction for a nucleus, so ↑↓ means that the first nucleus is up and the second down. Each orthohydrogen energy level then has a (nuclear) spin degeneracy of three, meaning that it corresponds to three states of the same energy (in the absence of a magnetic field). The singlet parahydrogen state has nuclear spin quantum numbers I = 0 and M_{I} = 0, with wavefunction $\textstyle\frac{1}{\sqrt{2}}(\left|\uparrow \downarrow \right\rangle - \left|\downarrow \uparrow \right\rangle)$. Since there is only one possibility, each parahydrogen level has a spin degeneracy of one and is said to be non-degenerate.

== Allowed rotational energy levels ==
Since protons have spin 1/2, they are fermions and the permutational antisymmetry of the total H_{2} wavefunction imposes restrictions on the possible rotational states of the two forms of H_{2}. Orthohydrogen, with symmetric nuclear spin functions, can only have rotational wavefunctions that are antisymmetric with respect to permutation of the two protons, corresponding to odd values of the rotational quantum number J; conversely, parahydrogen with an antisymmetric nuclear spin function, can only have rotational wavefunctions that are symmetric with respect to permutation of the two protons, corresponding to even J.

The para form whose lowest level is J = 0 is more stable by 1.455 kJ/mol than the ortho form whose lowest level is J = 1. The ratio between numbers of ortho and para molecules is about 3:1 at standard temperature where many rotational energy levels are populated, favoring the ortho form as a result of thermal energy. However, at low temperatures only the J = 0 level is appreciably populated, so that the para form dominates at low temperatures (approximately 99.8% at 20 K). The heat of vaporization is only 0.904 kJ/mol. As a result, ortho liquid hydrogen equilibrating to the para form releases enough energy to cause significant loss by boiling.

== Thermal properties ==
Applying the rigid rotor approximation, the energies and degeneracies of the rotational states are given by:

$$E_J = \frac{J(J + 1)\hbar^2}{2I};\quad g_J = 2J + 1$$.

The rotational partition function is conventionally written as:

$$Z_\text{rot} = \sum\limits_{J=0}^\infty{g_J e^{-E_J/k_\text{B} T\;}}$$.

However, as long as the two spin isomers are not in equilibrium, it is more useful to write separate partition functions for each:

$$\begin{align}
Z_{\text{para}} &= \sum\limits_{\text{even }J}{(2J + 1)e^{{-J(J + 1)\hbar^2}/{2Ik_\text{B} T}\;}}\\
Z_{\text{ortho}} &= 3\sum\limits_{\text{odd }J}{(2J + 1)e^{{-J(J + 1)\hbar^2}/{2Ik_\text{B} T}\;}}
\end{align}$$

The factor of 3 in the partition function for orthohydrogen accounts for the spin degeneracy associated with the +1 spin state; when equilibrium between the spin isomers is possible, then a general partition function incorporating this degeneracy difference can be written as:

$$Z_\text{equil} = \sum\limits_{J=0}^\infty{\left(2 - (-1)^{J}\right)(2J + 1)e^{{-J(J + 1)\hbar^2}/{2Ik_\text{B} T}\;}}$$

The molar rotational energies and heat capacities are derived for any of these cases from:

$$\begin{align}
U_\text{rot} &= RT^2 \left( \frac{\partial \ln Z_\text{rot}}{\partial T} \right) \\
C_{v,\text{ rot}} &= \frac{\partial U_\text{rot}}{\partial T}
\end{align}$$

Plots shown here are molar rotational energies and heat capacities for ortho- and parahydrogen, and the "normal" ortho:para ratio (3:1) and equilibrium mixtures:

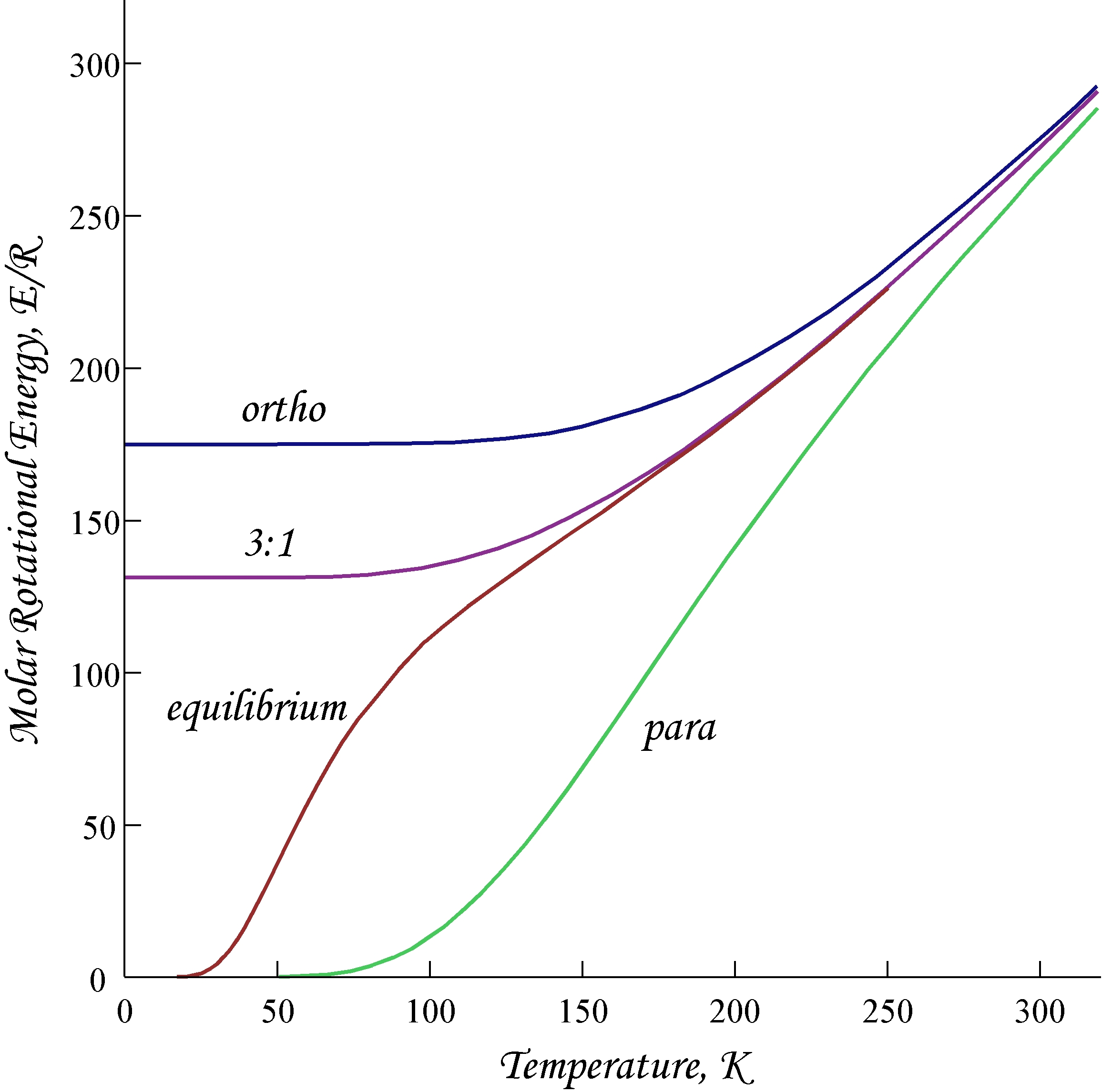
Molar rotational energy E_{R}/R in kelvins, or equivalently mean molecular rotational energy ε_{rot}/k_{B} in kelvins

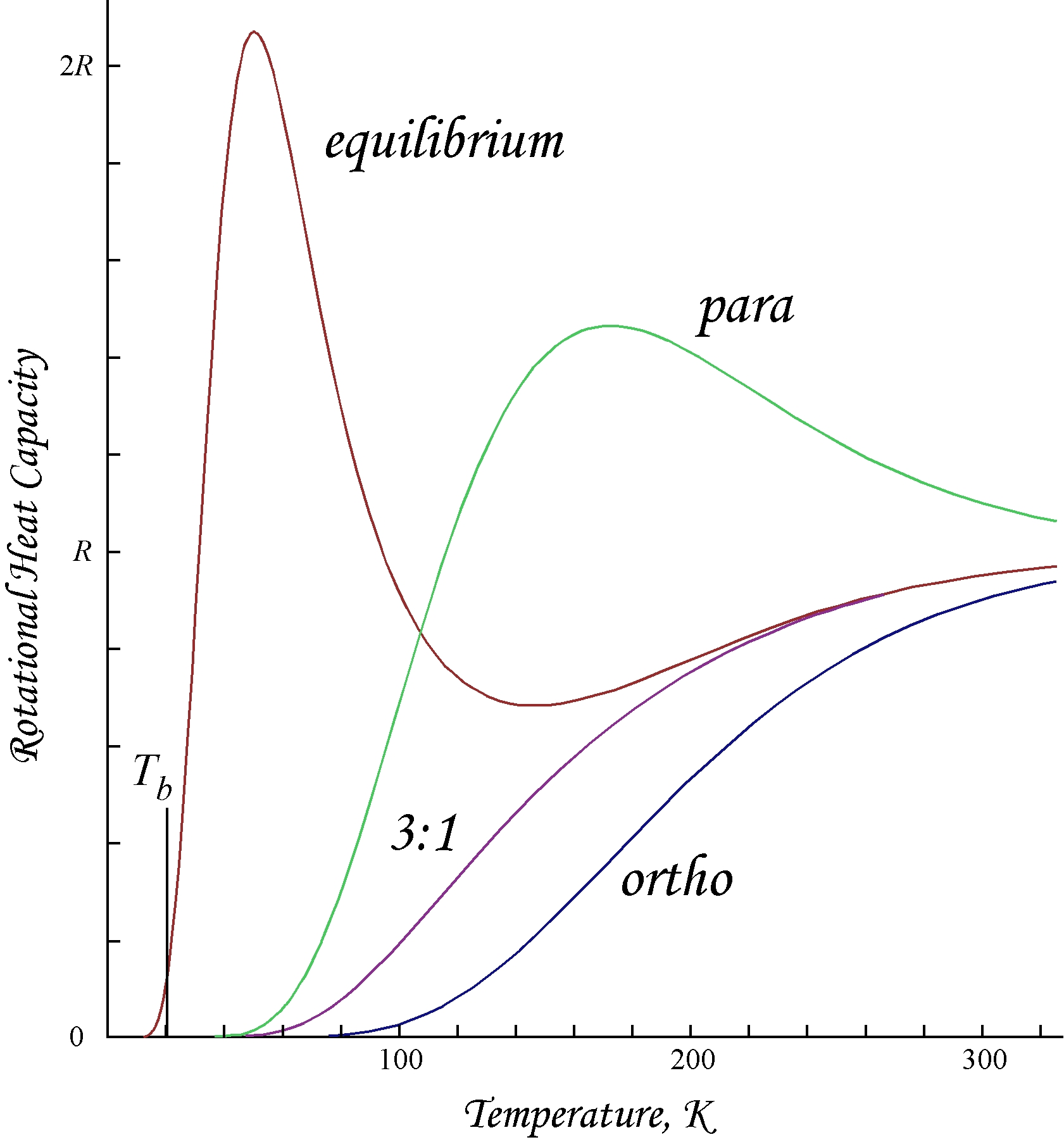
Molar heat capacities; only rotational and spin contribution is shown. Total value is 1.5R higher due to translational degrees of freedom (rotational degrees were included in the rigid rotor approximation itself).

Because of the antisymmetry-imposed restriction on possible rotational states, orthohydrogen has residual rotational energy at low temperature wherein nearly all the molecules are in the J = 1 state (molecules in the symmetric spin-triplet state cannot fall into the lowest, symmetric rotational state) and possesses nuclear-spin entropy due to the triplet state's threefold degeneracy. The residual energy is significant because the rotational energy levels are relatively widely spaced in H_{2}; the gap between the first two levels when expressed in temperature units is twice the characteristic rotational temperature for H_{2}:

$$\frac{E_{J=1} - E_{J=0}}{k_\text{B}} = 2\theta_\text{rot} = \frac{\hbar^2}{k_\text{B}I} \approx 174.98\text{ K}$$.

This is the T = 0 intercept seen in the molar energy of orthohydrogen. Since "normal" room-temperature hydrogen is a 3:1 ortho:para mixture, its molar residual rotational energy at low temperature is (3/4) × 2Rθ_{rot} ≈ 1091 J/mol, which is somewhat larger than the enthalpy of vaporization of normal hydrogen, 904 J/mol at the boiling point, T_{b} ≈ 20.369 K. Notably, the boiling points of parahydrogen and normal (3:1) hydrogen are nearly equal; for parahydrogen ∆H_{vap} ≈ 898 J/mol at T_{b} ≈ 20.277 K, and it follows that nearly all the residual rotational energy of orthohydrogen is retained in the liquid state.

However, orthohydrogen is thermodynamically unstable at low temperatures and spontaneously converts into parahydrogen. This process lacks any natural de-excitation radiation mode, so it is slow in the absence of a catalyst which can facilitate interconversion of the singlet and triplet spin states. At room temperature, hydrogen contains 75% orthohydrogen, a proportion which the liquefaction process preserves if carried out in the absence of a catalyst like ferric oxide, activated carbon, platinized asbestos, rare earth metals, uranium compounds, chromic oxide, or some nickel compounds to accelerate the conversion of the liquid hydrogen into parahydrogen. Alternatively, additional refrigeration equipment can be used to slowly absorb the heat that the orthohydrogen fraction will (more slowly) release as it spontaneously converts into parahydrogen. If orthohydrogen is not removed from rapidly liquified hydrogen, without a catalyst, the heat released during its decay can boil off as much as 50% of the original liquid.

== History ==
The unusual heat capacity of hydrogen was discovered in 1912 by Arnold Eucken. The two forms of molecular hydrogen were first proposed by Werner Heisenberg and Friedrich Hund in 1927. Taking into account this theoretical framework, pure parahydrogen was first synthesized by Paul Harteck and Karl Friedrich Bonhoeffer in 1929 at the Kaiser Wilhelm Institute for Physical Chemistry and Electrochemistry. When Heisenberg was awarded the 1932 Nobel prize in physics for the creation of quantum mechanics, this discovery of the "allotropic forms of hydrogen" was singled out as its most noteworthy application. Further work on the properties and chemical reactivity of parahydrogen was carried out in the following decade by Elly Schwab-Agallidis and Georg-Maria Schwab.

== Uses ==
=== In infrared spectroscopy ===
Isolation of pure parahydrogen uses continuous in-vacuum deposition, resulting in millimeters thick solid parahydrogen (p–H_{2}) samples which are notable for their excellent optical qualities. Parahydrogen is used as a host for matrix isolation studies: since hydrogen interacts weakly with other molecules, the infrared spectrum of these molecules embedded in parahydrogen films has sharp linewidths.

=== In NMR and MRI ===
When an excess of parahydrogen is used during hydrogenation reactions (instead of the normal mixture of orthohydrogen to parahydrogen of 3:1), the resultant product exhibits hyperpolarized signals in proton NMR spectra, an effect termed PHIP (Parahydrogen-induced polarization) or, equivalently, PASADENA (Parahydrogen And Synthesis Allow Dramatically Enhanced Nuclear Alignment); named for first recognition of the effect by Bowers and Weitekamp of Caltech), a phenomenon that has been used to study the mechanism of hydrogenation reactions.

Signal amplification by reversible exchange (SABRE) is a technique to hyperpolarize samples without chemically modifying them. Compared to orthohydrogen or organic molecules, a much greater fraction of the hydrogen nuclei in parahydrogen align with an applied magnetic field. In SABRE, a metal center reversibly binds to both the test molecule and a parahydrogen molecule facilitating the target molecule to pick up the polarization of the parahydrogen. This technique can be improved and utilized for a wide range of organic molecules by using an intermediate "relay" molecule like ammonia. The ammonia efficiently binds to the metal center and picks up the polarization from the parahydrogen. The ammonia then transfers the polarization to other molecules that don't bind as well to the metal catalyst. This enhanced NMR signal allows the rapid analysis of very small amounts of material and has great potential for applications in magnetic resonance imaging.

== Deuterium ==
Diatomic deuterium (D_{2}) has nuclear spin isomers like diatomic hydrogen, but with different populations of the two forms because the deuterium nucleus (deuteron) is a boson with nuclear spin equal to one. There are six possible nuclear spin wave functions which are ortho or symmetric to exchange of the two nuclei, and three which are para or antisymmetric. Ortho states correspond to even rotational levels with symmetric rotational functions so that the total wavefunction is symmetric as required for the exchange of two bosons, and para states correspond to odd rotational levels. The ground state (J = 0) populated at low temperature is ortho, and at standard temperature the ortho:para ratio is 2:1.

== Other substances with spin isomers ==
Other molecules and functional groups containing two hydrogen atoms, such as water and methylene (CH_{2}), also have ortho- and para- forms (e.g. orthowater and parawater), but this is of little significance for their thermal properties. Their ortho:para ratios differ from that of dihydrogen. The ortho and para forms of water have recently been isolated. Para water was found to be 25% more reactive for a proton-transfer reaction.

Molecular oxygen (O_{2}) also exists in three lower-energy triplet states and one singlet state, as ground-state paramagnetic triplet oxygen and energized highly reactive diamagnetic singlet oxygen. These states arise from the spins of their unpaired electrons, not their protons or nuclei.
