= Parahydrogen-induced polarization =

Parahydrogen-induced polarization (PHIP) is a hyperpolarization method utilizing parahydrogen (one of the two spin isomers of hydrogen), which can temporarily increase the signal intensity commonly in nuclear magnetic resonance (NMR), and has been explored in many demonstrations using magnetic resonance imaging (MRI) experiments. PHIP methods are commonly categorized in two ways – hydrogenative PHIP and non-hydrogenative PHIP. In hydrogenative PHIP, the parahydrogen is being added directly to the molecular site via hydrogenation reaction. Commonly encountered types of hydrogenative PHIP techniques include PASADENA and ALTADENA. In non-hydrogenative PHIP, spin order transfer from the parahydrogen to the target nuclei of interest occurs through a catalyst in a reversible exchange process. Common types of non-hydrogenative PHIP methods include SABRE. PHIP methods have most commonly been applied to NMR spectroscopy, which can include in-vitro metabolite monitoring, in addition to in-vivo or ex-vivo MRI demonstrations.

== Overview ==
Conventional non ^{1}H NMR and MRI signals can be weak due to low nuclear spin polarization levels at thermal equilibrium and/or low natural abundance of NMR compatible nuclear isotopes (e.g., ^{13}C, ^{15}N, etc.). Common methods to improve sensitivity may include increasing sample concentration or using an instrument containing a larger magnetic field. However, hyperpolarization techniques can enhance signal intensity in the fields of NMR and MRI, while using relatively low sample concentrations, and utilizing standard NMR (e.g., 9.4 T) to benchtop NMR (e.g., 1–2 T) magnetic fields. One method of hyperpolarization, named parahydrogen-induced polarization, utilizes parahydrogen to transfer spin order to the target nuclei of interest in a given molecule/sample. Exploring the basic underlying spin-order principle and corresponding core experimental applications can further develop broad understanding of PHIP.

PHIP can commonly be categorized in two methods: hydrogenative or reversible exchange (SABRE-family). In hydrogenative PHIP, the two hydrogen atoms of a parahydrogen molecule undergo pairwise addition to an unsaturated bond of the molecule of target during catalysis, which allows for hyperpolarization of the target nuclei in that molecule. In reversible exchange (e.g., SABRE), parahydrogen spin order is transferred via a metal-based catalyst to the target nuclei of interest in the hyperpolarized molecule via scalar coupling (i.e., J-coupling) network as a reversible process, which leads to the parahydrogen being converted to orthohydrogen to varying degrees depending on conditions. This means that after spin order is transferred from parahydrogen to the target nuclei, the system will undergo substrate exchange, which allows for hyperpolarization buildup. The differences between these two common PHIP techniques have practical implications for experiments and applications.

A brief outline of PHIP experimental preparation includes cooling room temperature hydrogen gas (roughly 75% ortho to 25% para) to cryogenic temperatures (e.g., 30 K) using a catalyst to increase parahydrogen purity from roughly 25% at room temperature to, for example, 97%. Then, substrate and catalyst are combined, where enriched parahydrogen is introduced to the system in a magnetic field under specified conditions to generate hyperpolarization, which in turn results in hyperpolarization detection via NMR or MRI. Due to the generally short-lived transient nature of hyperpolarization signals due to decay via spin relaxation, instrumental detection must occur quickly.

== Applications in chemistry of materials ==
In chemistry of materials, PHIP is a tool for determining structure and dynamics of organic compounds. Hyperpolarizing polymeric targets include PHIP-reactive sites/handles (e.g., unsaturated bond) for hydrogenative PHIP, which can be placed at the terminal chain end, or side chains. One such polymer architectural motif is hyperbranched polymers, which can be used when designing PHIP-active handles. Münnemann et al. reported hyperpolarization of biocompatible hyperbranched polymers using PHIP, where they stated it as “the first hyperpolarisation of polymers using PHIP.”

The use of polymers as hyperpolarization platforms in PHIP experiments is not limited to polymeric resin support but also extends to nanoscale support platforms. One 2015 study by Shi et al., in their article titled “Nanoscale Catalysts for NMR Signal Enhancement by Reversible Exchange” utilized a PVP polymer-comb catalyst, and titanium oxide (TiO_{2})/PMAA core-shell nanoparticles tethered to an iridium-based catalyst for SABRE experiments. Using these materials, researchers explored how changing the hyperpolarization support platform from a polymer comb to a core-shell nanoparticle affects the catalyst exhibiting homogeneous and heterogeneous conditions, which resulted in ^{1}H NMR enhancement. These support platforms enable a better understanding of the system’s homogeneous/heterogeneous behavior. In contrast to the research findings of Min et al. with an emphasis on polymeric applications for catalyst water compatibility and recyclability, the work by Shi et al. puts a focus on utilizing polymers for hyperpolarization support architecture and interface design.

Chemistry of polymers/materials applications in PHIP has been demonstrated at the research level in several studies but has yet to develop established routines. A current limitation is that not all polymers can be used in PHIP experiments, which limit their scope. Using conventional NMR on these large PHIP compatible molecules yields limitations in sensitivity and broad signals, where PHIP experiments have potential to overcome such challenges. Additionally, it has been demonstrated that the use of polymers as hyperpolarization platforms further expands their application by utilizing resins/nanoscale catalyst platforms, although these systems are still in the research level of study. With increasing advances in polymer application, widening the scope of direct polymer PHIP targets, recyclable and water compatible polymeric supported catalysts, and improved engineering of polymer/nanoparticle interfaces can help further advance PHIP in the field of materials chemistry.

== Non-hydrogenative PHIP ==
Non-hydrogenative PHIP refers to reversible exchange methods, typically entailing SABRE (Signal Amplification By Reversible Exchange). This method does not add hydrogen to the target molecule via hydrogenation reaction, in contrast to hydrogenative PHIP, which achieves this via pairwise addition to an unsaturated bond. Reversible exchange refers to the way in which parahydrogen binds to the metal containing catalyst (commonly iridium-based), where the singlet spin order of parahydrogen gets converted to observable magnetization via spin-spin transfer interactions to the target nuclei of interest. Once the target nuclei are hyperpolarized, the molecule unbinds the catalyst (hence reversible). This process of hyperpolarizing with a new set of parahydrogen and soon-to-be hyperpolarized substrate can occur in repeated polarization cycles with zero structural changes. Note that while SABRE almost always entails a non-hydrogenative process, less commonly it can include hydrogen exchange methods.

The source of the signal enhancement in non-hydrogenative PHIP comes from the singlet ordered parahydrogen, and through the metal catalyst, that spin order is transferred to the target nuclei (non-zero spin quantum number) through the scalar coupling network (i.e., J-coupling network, spin coupling network), which results in observable magnetization. The efficiency of the spin order transfer strongly depends on the magnetic field employed, where this magnetic field creates a Zeeman splitting of the targeted nuclei to have its frequency in the energy difference between spin energy states to be roughly comparable to its J-coupling frequency, particularly in low or ultra-low magnetic fields. Additionally, chemical exchange kinetics have a large role in dictating successful hyperpolarization of substrate (binding and unbinding by the substrate and parahydrogen on and off the catalyst).

The most common method for non-hydrogenative PHIP is SABRE. There are variants of SABRE, because polarization transfer efficiency depends on several factors, such as the target nuclei, substrate binding kinetics, and the magnetic field employed. SABRE SHEATH (SHield Enables Alignment Transfer to Heteronuclei) is a common variant of SABRE, where it was developed for improving polarization transfer efficiency, especially for ^{15}N, and employs ultra-low magnetic fields. SABRE Relay helps broaden substrate scope, which involves hyperpolarization of an intermediate (non-targeted) species that then transfers that polarization to the target nuclei of another species. Field optimizations, including low-field, Earth-field, and other fields, are commonly optimized in SABRE methods.

The experimental setups of non-hydrogenative PHIP usually require enriched parahydrogen, a compatible metal complex catalyst (e.g., iridium-based), and a substrate compatible with reversible exchange. In addition to binding kinetics of the substrate, signal enhancement may also depend on the catalyst employed, catalyst concentration, substrate concentration, co-ligand employed, co-ligand concentration, temperature, solvent system, parahydrogen bubbling time, and magnetic field used during polarization transfer. Specifically, magnetic field optimization has a profound effect, as SABRE is highly field dependent for different nuclei, along with different substrates of the same nuclei. An advantage of non-hydrogenative PHIP is that the hyperpolarized substrates typically do not undergo any structural modifications, which allows for cycles of regenerated polarization. However, due to the T_{1} relaxation times, experiments must be executed in a timely manner before the signal enhancement diminishes.

Non-hydrogenative PHIP, more in particular SABRE, have been used as applications of analytical NMR, biomedical MR, and other sensitivity-related methods. SABRE methods for hyperpolarization are commonly known to be fast, and requiring no structural modification. In analytical NMR, SABRE can be used to detect low concentration analytes, such as the use of in-vitro cellular experiments. SABRE has also been employed in biomedical and MRI related research. A key downside to SABRE is that it is not universally applicable to all molecules. Additionally, SABRE experiments have limitations with biocompatibility, such as the use of a heavy metal catalyst, and solvent systems. Currently, researchers are focused on expanding the SABRE substrate scope, along with improving biocompatibility, and further enhancing signals.

== Hydrogenative PHIP ==
Hydrogenative PHIP is a branch of PHIP that involves chemically adding parahydrogen to an unsaturated bond of the target substrate via a hydrogenation reaction. Such unsaturated bonds are commonly seen as alkene or alkyne functionalities, where both of the hydrogen atoms in parahydrogen are added via pairwise addition. Specifically, pairwise addition is key to preserving the singlet spin order derived from parahydrogen. This is in large contrast to non-hydrogenative PHIP methods, such as SABRE-related methods, where reversible exchange occurs while the targeted molecule remains chemically unchanged. Intuitively, the molecule detected in hydrogenative PHIP is the hydrogenated product, not the original unsaturated precursor.

The transfer of singlet spin order from the pairwise addition of parahydrogen to the hydrogenated product results in signal readout in NMR/MRI. The parahydrogen’s singlet state is NMR silent, thus not directly observable. The two added hydrogen atoms are typically magnetically inequivalent, hence allow for an observable enhanced magnetic resonance signal that may result in antiphase signals, and can even lead to spin order transfer from the hydrogen nuclei to a targeted nucleus (e.g., ^{13}C, ^{15}N). Features listed, such as enhanced NMR signals and antiphase signal patterns are dependent on the chemical nature of the targeted molecule, along with field conditions and system conditions (e.g., catalyst, solvent system, temperature, co-ligands) employed.

Two commonly used hydrogenative PHIP techniques include PASADENA (Parahydrogen And Synthesis Allow Dramatically Enhanced Nuclear Alignment) and ALTADENA (Adiabatic Longitudinal Transport After Dissociation Engenders Net Alignment). The field conditions of PASADENA commonly occur in a high magnetic field, such as inside of an NMR bore, and the resulting product is detected under high field conditions. In contrast, ALTADENA typically takes place under low field conditions, such as that around Earth’s magnetic field (~30–60 µT), where subsequent product detection occurs under high field conditions. These different methods utilizing different field conditions can result in differing NMR signal patterns observed, which can show up as absorptive or antiphase signals. Both methods still rely on the pairwise addition of parahydrogen to an unsaturated bond and the preserving of parahydrogen singlet order, hence being part of the same family.

Hydrogenative PHIP experiments require enriched parahydrogen, an unsaturated molecule acting as a precursor, and a compatible hydrogenation catalyst. The most common precursor molecules typically contain an alkene or alkyne functional moiety, which allows for pairwise addition of parahydrogen. The catalyst employed differs from non-hydrogenative PHIP in the sense that it must facilitate the hydrogenation reaction and allow efficient pairwise addition to occur while preserving the singlet spin order of parahydrogen, as opposed to SABRE methods relying on reversible exchange with no net hydrogenation of the substrate. Different substrates, solvents, and applications in hydrogenative PHIP utilize different types of catalysts, such as homogeneous and heterogeneous catalyst systems. The type of hydrogenative PHIP used, and more importantly, the field strength employed, can determine the NMR signal pattern observed, where signal detection must occur quickly due to T_{1}-relaxation. Some of the optimization parameters for experiments may include catalyst loading, reaction rate, substrate concentration, catalyst concentration, temperature, solvent system, pressure, and timing.

Applications of hydrogenative PHIP have occurred in NMR, MRI, reaction monitoring, and metabolic studies. Such applications are possible given that hydrogenative PHIP temporarily enhances magnetic resonance signals, which enables detection of low-concentration analytes/metabolites. Examples of hyperpolarized products, metabolites, and probes observed after undergoing hydrogenative PHIP in a biomedical application can include succinate, fumarate, acetate, or pyruvate derivatives. One drawback to this method is the need for an unsaturated precursor molecule that allows for pairwise addition and preserving the parahydrogen-derived singlet spin order under specified conditions. Even after successful hydrogenation, the T_{1} relaxation demands the operator to acquire a magnetic resonance scan quickly, which puts heavy emphasis on time constraints. Apart from the limitations, hydrogenative PHIP has potential to be used in relatively unexplored research applications.
