= Xenon gas MRI =

Medical imaging technique

Hyperpolarized ^{129}Xe gas magnetic resonance imaging (MRI) is a medical imaging technique used to visualize the anatomy and physiology of body regions that are difficult to image with standard proton MRI. In particular, the lung, which lacks substantial density of protons, is particularly useful to be visualized with ^{129}Xe gas MRI. This technique has promise as an early-detection technology for chronic lung diseases and imaging technique for processes and structures reliant on dissolved gases. ^{129}Xe is a stable, naturally occurring isotope of xenon with 26.44% isotope abundance. It is one of two Xe isotopes, along with ^{131}Xe, that has non-zero spin, which allows for magnetic resonance. ^{129}Xe is used for MRI because its large electron cloud permits hyperpolarization and a wide range of chemical shifts. The hyperpolarization creates a large signal intensity, and the wide range of chemical shifts allows for identifying when the ^{129}Xe associates with molecules like hemoglobin. ^{129}Xe is preferred over ^{131}Xe for MRI because ^{129}Xe has spin 1/2 (compared to 3/2 for ^{131}Xe), a longer T1, and 3.4 times larger gyromagnetic ratio (11.78 MHz/T).

== Uses ==
=== Medical uses ===
Xenon Xe 129 hyperpolarized
Clinical data
- Trade names: Xenoview
- License data: US DailyMed: Xenon Xe 129
- Routes of administration: Inhalation
- ATC code: None

Legal status
- Legal status: US: ℞-only

Identifiers
- CAS Number: 13965-99-6
- PubChem CID: 10290811
- UNII: 726Q6M95ZA
- KEGG: D12496

Xenon Xe 129 hyperpolarized, sold under the brand name Xenoview, is a hyperpolarized contrast agent indicated for use with magnetic resonance imaging (MRI) for evaluation of lung ventilation, and approved for people aged twelve years of age and older. It was approved for medical use in the US in December 2022.

The most common side effects include mouth and throat pain, headache, and dizziness.

The US Food and Drug Administration (FDA) considers it to be a first-in-class medication.

The FDA approved Xenoview based on evidence from two clinical trials in 83 participants with various lung disorders who were being evaluated for possible lung resection or lung transplantation. The trials were conducted at five sites in the United States and assessed both efficacy and safety of Xenoview. Xenoview was evaluated in two clinical trials of 83 adults with pulmonary disorders who each underwent sequential lung ventilation imaging with Xenoview with MRI and an approved comparator, Xe 133 scintigraphy. In study 1, participants were imaged to help plan possible lung resection. To determine the benefit of Xenoview, estimates of the percentage of lung ventilation predicted to remain after surgery made with Xenoview with MRI and comparator imaging were evaluated for equivalence. In study 2, participants were imaged to help plan possible lung transplantation. To determine the benefit of Xenoview, estimates of the percentage of lung ventilation contributed by the right lung made with Xenoview with MRI and comparator imaging were evaluated for equivalence.

== History ==
Hyperpolarized ^{129}Xe is achieved through spin-exchange optical pumping, a technique developed by Grover et al. in 1978 and improved by Happer et al. in 1984. Quantification of ^{129}Xe polarization was first described in 1982 by Bhaskar et al. The use of hyperpolarized ^{129}Xe gas in MRI ex-vivo was first described by Albert et al. in 1994 using excised rat lungs. The first in-vivo human studies with ^{129}Xe MRI were published by Mugler et al. in 1997.

^{129}Xe MRI has largely begun to replace ^{3}He gas MRI, a very similar technology that uses hyperpolarized ^{3}He molecules instead of ^{129}Xe. Grossman et al. began human clinical trials for ^{3}He MRI in 1996. ^{3}He was originally touted as the better gas for hyperpolarized gas MRI because it is more polarizable and has no effects on the body. However, ^{3}He is mostly produced by the beta decay of tritium (^{3}H), which is a product of nuclear warhead production. Additionally, ^{3}He is widely used by the U.S. military to detect smuggled plutonium. These combination of increasing scarcity and increasing demand have combined to make ^{3}He highly expensive, up to more than $1000 per liter.

== Safety ==
^{129}Xe is an inert, non-radioactive, non-toxic, and non-teratogenic molecule that has shown no significant adverse health effects when inhaled for MR imaging. One potential area of concern is ^{129}Xe's anesthetic properties when a large volume is inhaled. Xenon shows blood and tissue solubility that allows it to diffuse through the lung membrane and affect the nervous system. The minimum alveolar concentration for 50% of motor response to be prevented (MAC) is 0.71, which is not reached during imaging. Further studies have shown that it provides good circulatory stability when dissolved in blood and does not affect body temperature.

== Hyperpolarization ==
When applying an external magnetic field to gas, half of the nuclear spins of the gas atoms point towards the direction of the magnetic field whereas the other half point in the opposite direction. It is slightly more energetically favorable to be aligned with the magnetic field, meaning that one of the spin states is in slight excess of the other. This excess means that the two spin-states do not completely cancel each other out, creating a magnetic signal which can be observed with MRI. However, for traditional ^{1}H MRI, only about 4 ppm of the spin states do not cancel, so the signal is not particularly strong. This means that only regions with high densities of protons, like muscle tissue can be seen. Hyperpolarization is a means of flipping more of the atoms to have the same spin state so that less of the spin states cancel each other. In the case of ^{129}Xe, this leads to a 10^{4}-10^{5} improvement in signal strength.

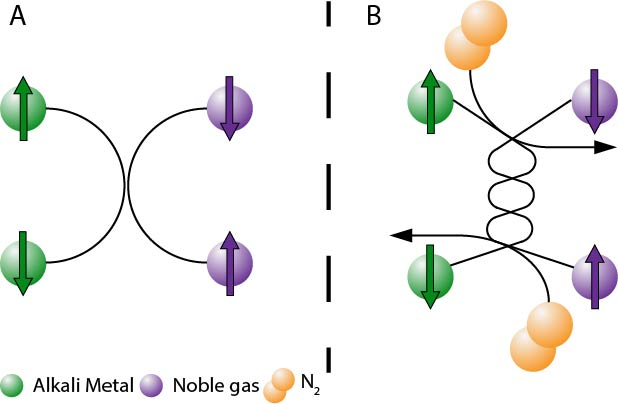
Polarization Transfer

Hyperpolarization of ^{129}Xe is usually performed using spin-exchange optical pumping (SEOP) using circularly polarized light to add angular momentum of the atoms. However, the polarized light cannot directly transfer angular momentum to the gas nuclei, thus, an alkali metal atom is used as an intermediary. Rubidium is often used to accomplish this, where the polarized light is tuned to provide exactly the necessary energy to excite rubidium's valence electron. This process is called optical pumping. In the next step, spin exchange, gas nuclei are introduced to the system and collide with the rubidium. They receive angular momentum in the collisions with rubidium valence electrons, which, by conservation of angular momentum, is in the same direction as the rubidium. Therefore, ^{129}Xe becomes hyperpolarized because there is a large excess of one spin state compared to the other. After this, the ^{129}Xe is extracted, the rubidium is polarized again, and the cycle continues.

== Required modifications to conventional MRI ==
Traditional MR scanners need to be modified to detect ^{129}Xe, as ^{129}Xe has a lower gyromagnetic ratio of 11.77 MHz/T compared to that of protons, 42.5 MHz/T. Thus, the Larmor frequency of ^{129}Xe is much lower, which is difficult to detect with conventional narrow-band RF amplifiers set to proton's Larmor frequency. Therefore, a broad-band RF amplifier, for both excitation and receiving, is required. Additionally, the pulse sequence must also accommodate the difference in thermally-polarized protons and polarized ^{129}Xe. In proton MRI, a typical pulse sequence would involve a 90° flip then a subsequent T1 longitudinal relaxation to the external magnetic field. T1 relaxation in hyperpolarized gas involves the decay of magnetization and not the return to an external magnetic field, as in thermally-polarized protons. Therefore, after a 90° flip, a hyperpolarized gas nuclei's longitudinal relaxation is negligible, making the longitudinal magnetization remain zero after the flip. As a result, traditional 90° and 180° RF pulses are not desirable. A low-angle RF pulse is therefore used to only remove a portion of the total available magnetization of the hyperpolarized ^{129}Xe gas. This produces comparable longitudinal magnetization between protons and ^{129}Xe gas. Furthermore, as an image needs to be acquired within a breath-hold, a fast pulse-sequences, or fast-gradient echos, are used to adequately sample the k-space.

== Applications ==
=== Ventilation MRI ===
After a patient inhales the hyperpolarized gas, the gas passes through the airways within the lungs. In a healthy lung, the gas is able to travel throughout the lungs. However, in a disease that obstructs airways, such as chronic obstructive pulmonary disease (COPD), asthma, and cystic fibrosis, the hyperpolarized gas is unable to reach certain regions within the lung. Thus, a spin-density weighted image will produce high signals from normal areas and low signals from diseased regions. ^{3}He was originally used for this type of image, but recently there has been a shift towards to ^{129}Xe due to its availability and cheaper price. Hyperpolarized ^{3}He has historically produced superior images because it is easier to hyperpolarize, but current technology has improved gas polarization of ^{129}Xe to the point where the image quality is similar. Furthermore, ^{129}Xe is more sensitive to obstructions as it is a larger atom than ^{3}He. In addition, an increased inhaled volume of ^{129}Xe results in a comparable SNR to that of ^{3}He, up to 1 vs 0.1-0.3 liters.

=== Diffusion MRI ===
Diffusion MRI involves calculating the apparent diffusion coefficient (ADC) of the hyperpolarized gas. Diffusion-sensitizing gradients are applied to induce diffusion based attenuation to calculate the ADC. These gradients have an associated b-value, which represents the strength and duration of the gradients. At least 2 different b-value gradients are used to calculate the ADC. The ADC provides information regarding how the structure of the lung restricts the hyperpolarized gas diffusion. The value of the ADC increases in regions of increased space. For example, in healthy lungs, the ADC using ^{129}Xe might be around 0.04 cm^{2}/s whereas the ADC for ^{129}Xe in an open space may be around 0.14 cm^{2}/s. In emphysema, where alveolar structures enlarge, the gas is able to diffuse more freely, resulting in a higher ADC compared to normal regions providing information of disease areas. Ultimately, this is a novel imaging modality enabled by ^{129}Xe MRI, and its use is being investigated for Chronic Obstructive Pulmonary Disease, Asthma, Cystic Fibrosis, Long-COVID-19, and other diseases.

=== Partial pressure of oxygen ===
The longitudinal relaxation (T1) of the hyperpolarized gas is inversely proportional to the concentration of the oxygen in the lung. The interaction between paramagnetic oxygen significantly decreases the relaxation time, which offers insights into the partial pressure of oxygen (pO_{2}) within regions of the lung. Additionally, the ventilation to perfusion ratio can be calculated from these images. Most research has employed ^{3}He, but improved technology has allowed for comparable results when using ^{129}Xe. However, due to the uptake of ^{129}Xe, its relaxation is much quicker than ^{3}He resulting in higher apparent pO_{2} if left unaccounted.

== Research ==
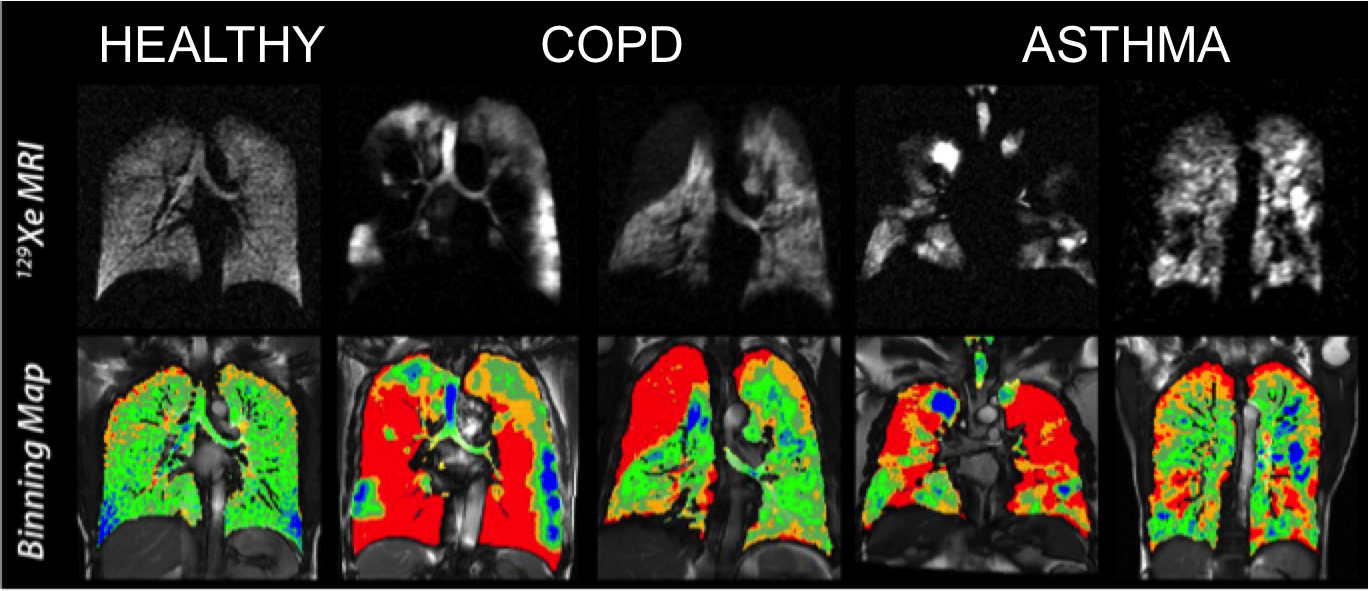
Xe Gas MRI of Healthy and Diseased Lungs. Colors show different intensities of Xe Gas.

^{129}Xe gas MRI is being researched as a diagnostic test for respiratory diseases, such as COPD, asthma, and emphysema. Spirometry pulmonary function tests are used to determine the condition of lung function. However, this is a fairly basic, global assessment of lung function that does not provide specific information about the lung structure and physiology. For structural information, X-Ray CT is most commonly used, but it exposes the patient to high doses of ionizing radiation and it provides no functional information Conventional ^{1}H MRI is not effective in the lung airspace because of the minimal proton density. ^{129}Xe gas MRI provides detailed, specific information about lung structure and function that are not safely or efficiently obtainable by existing technologies.

=== Visualizing non-lung tissues ===
^{129}Xe gas is most commonly used to visualize the lung because it is a gas. However, small bubbles of xenon gas are capable of dissolving into the bloodstream at the alveoli. As these bubbles travel around the body, they can be used to gain insight into other regions of the body. ^{129}Xe gas is capable of crossing the blood brain barrier, allowing novel study of brain perfusion.r

=== Improving amount of hyperpolarization ===
Using hyperpolarized gas to image the lungs is not particularly novel, as the use of ^{3}He was established in the early 2000s. ^{3}He was originally chosen because it was easily hyperpolarized to a very large degree, and therefore generated a very strong signal. Recently, improvements in hyperpolarization techniques have been able to generate more hyperpolarized ^{129}Xe, enabling it to generate comparable images to ^{3}He.
