= MICAD =

The Molecular Imaging and Contrast Agent Database or MICAD was a freely accessible online source of information on in vivo molecular imaging agents. It was established as a key component of the "Molecular Libraries and Imaging" program of the NIH Roadmap, a set of major inter-agency initiatives accelerating medical research and the development of new, more specific therapies for a wide range of diseases.

== Content ==
MICAD includes agents developed for imaging modalities such as positron emission tomography (PET), single photon emission computed tomography (SPECT), magnetic resonance imaging (MRI), ultrasound, computed tomography, optical imaging, and planar gamma imaging. It contains textual information, references, numerous links to MEDLINE and to other relevant resources from the National Center for Biotechnology Information (NCBI).

== Process ==
MICAD is edited by a team of scientific editors and curators at the National Library of Medicine, NIH. It is being developed under the guidance of a trans-NIH panel of experts in the field. Members of the imaging community are invited to contribute to the MICAD database by writing and submitting entries (chapters) on agents of their choice for online publication. The MICAD works with individual guest authors and can be contacted via email.

== External ==
Official site (archived)
