= Ultrasound-switchable fluorescence imaging =

Deep optics imaging technique

Ultrasound-switchable fluorescence (USF) imaging is a deep optics imaging technique. In last few decades, fluorescence microscopy has been highly developed to image biological samples and live tissues. However, due to light scattering, fluorescence microscopy is limited to shallow tissues (about 1 mm). Since fluorescence is characterized by high contrast, high sensitivity, and low cost which is crucial to investigate deep tissue information, developing fluorescence imaging technique with high depth-to-resolution ratio would be promising.. Recently, ultrasound-switchable fluorescence imaging has been developed to achieve high signal-to-noise ratio (SNR) and high spatial resolution imaging without sacrificing image depth.

== Basic principle ==
The theoretical model was first proposed by Yuan in 2009. Yuan developed an ultrasound-modulated fluorescence based on a fluorophore-quencher-labeled microbubble system which can control the fluorescent emission inside the ultrasound-focal zone to increase the spatial resolution and SNR of the imaging. In terms of the USF imaging principle, a short ultrasound pulse is applied to activate the fluorescent emission inside the ultrasound focal volume without triggering fluorescence outside of the ultrasound focal volume. Thus, the fluorophores distribution in the ultrasound focal zone can be distinguished and imaged by screening the target. Two basic elements are required in USF imaging technique, the first is unique USF contrast agents whose fluorescence emission can be controlled by a focused ultrasound wave. Secondly, a sensitive USF imaging system is also required to detect the signal and suppress the background noise.

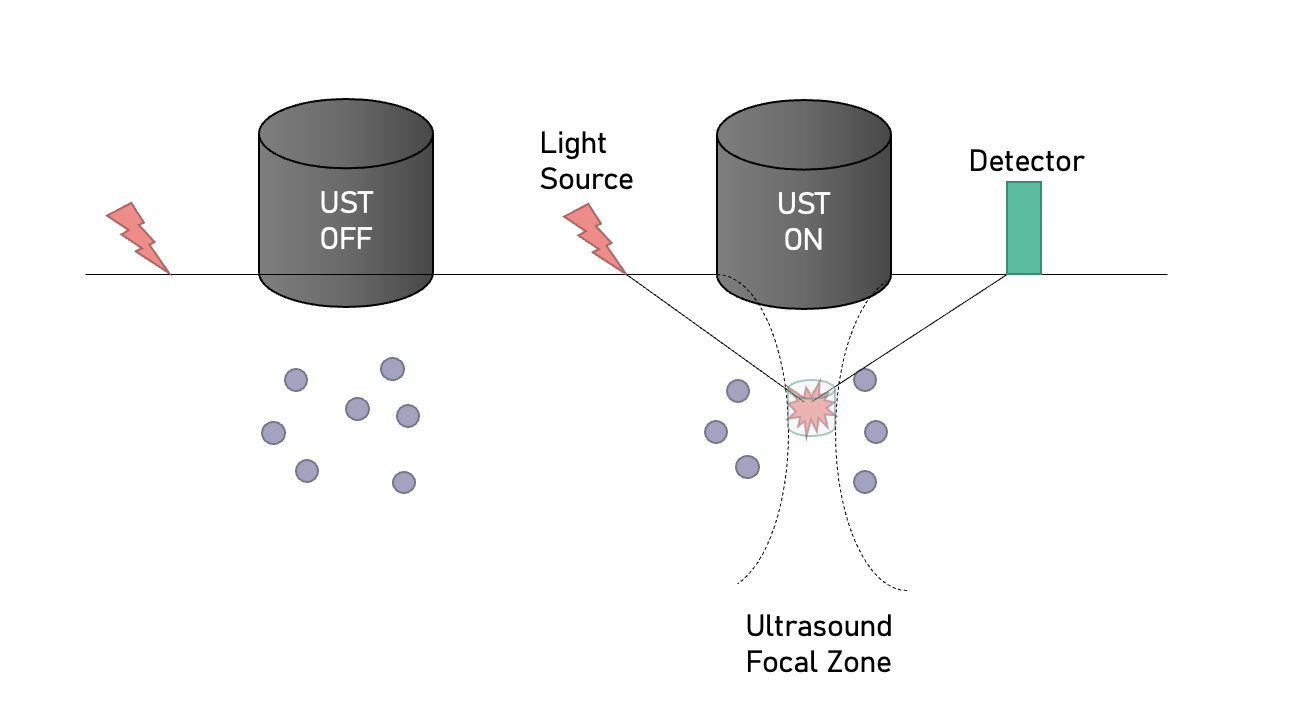

=== Imaging contrast agents ===
At present, two types of contrast agents have been developed.

- Fluorophore-quencher-labeled microbubble

The first type is fluorophore-quencher-labeled microbubble which is first discovered by Yuan in 2019, and developed by Liu et al. in 2014. The basic principle of this type of contrast agent is to change the fluorophore concentration on the microbubble surface. In 2000, Morgan et al. found that negative ultrasound wave can make the microbubble several times bigger. As a result, the distance between quencher and fluorophore on microbubble surface become larger (the concentration of the fluorophore on the surface are reduced) which means the quenching efficiency is extremely decreased and the fluorophore shows high emission efficiency (ON state). The microbubble outside the ultrasound focal zone keep the same small size during the whole process, so the quenching efficiency is always high enough to suppress the fluorophore emission (OFF state).

- Fluorophore-labeled thermosensitive polymers or fluorophore-encapsulated nanoparticles (NPs)

The second type of contrast agents is fluorophore-labeled thermosensitive polymers or fluorophore-encapsulated nanoparticles (NPs). The critical part of this kind of agent is the combination of the thermo-sensitive carrier and environment-sensitive (usually polarity-sensitive) fluorophore labeled on it. When the environment temperature is under a certain threshold (T_{th1}), the polarity of the carrier on which the fluorophore shows quite low emission efficiency (OFF state). When focused ultrasound is applied, the focal zone is heated above a temperature threshold (T_{th2}) and the structure of the thermo-sensitive carrier will be changed which makes the polarity of it changes too, therefore, the polarity-sensitive fluorophore will be swathed on. During the whole process, the fluorophore outside of the ultrasound focal zone keep switched off because the temperature is under T_{th1}.

=== USF imgaing system ===
The purpose of the USF imaging system is to sensitively detect the USF signal and dramatically suppress the background noise. The image system first dramatically increase the system sensitivity by adopting a lock-in amplifier and a cooled photomultiplier tube(PMT); Then the system use a correlation algorithm to distinguish the USF signal from the background noise; Also, it detects only the change of the fluorescence signal caused by the ultrasound, The modulated-frequency excitation laser keep running all the time, the ultrasound-induced temperature rise change the amplitude of the fluorescence signal in modulated frequency. After interfering with a phase-locked reference signal, the lock-in amplifier reports the USF signal; The system can also reduce laser leakage by using several emission filters.

== Signal to Noise ratio ==
USF imaging can increase the SNR by differentiating signal photons from background photons. The background photons may come from autofluoresence, light scattering, imperfect contrast agents and laser leakage. To reduce autofluoresence, the NIR fluorophore can be adopted since the biological tissue components produce least autofloresence in NIR region. According to rayleigh theory:

I(r,θ) = 1/λ^{4}

The light with large wavelength scatter less, so the light scattering which result in part of the background noise can be reduced. Also, by adopting ultrasound to control the fluorescent emission, the signal fluorophore can be easily differentiate from the background fluorophore. As we mentioned above, the laser leakage can be minimized by emission filters.

== Spatial resolution ==
When using second type of contrast agents (fluorophore-labeled thermosensitive NPs), the spatial resolution can be further improved based on two mechanisms.

- Nonlinear acoustic effect

Acoustic diffraction is the main obstacle to increase the spatial resolution. By controlling ultrasound exposure power, the nonlinear acoustic effect can occur, as a result, a part of acoustic energy at the fundamental frequency can be transferred to higher harmonic frequency components in the focal volume which can be more tightly focused. This is the major reason that nonlinear acoustic effect can reduce the ultrasound-induced temperature focal size.

- Thermal confinement

The spatial resolution of the USF technique is determined by the size of the region where the fluorophores can be switched ON. Only the temperature is above the threshold, the fluorephore can be switched on. However, due to the thermal diffusion or conduction, ultrasound-induced thermal energy need to be confined within the focal volume size by controlling the ultrasound exposure time, so the fluorophores can be switched ON is usually smaller than the actual focal size of the ultrasound.

== Applications ==
The USF technique can be combined with a light-pulse-delay technique and a photon counting technique to achieve high-resolution imaging in a deep turbid medium. In 2016, Cheng et al. achieved high-resolution fluorescence imaging in centimeter-deep tissue phantoms with high SNR and high sensitivity, they synthesized and characterized a NIR extremely environment-sensitive fluorophore, ADP(CA)2, and a family of USF contrast agents based on this dye. In the recent study in 2019, Yao et al. first achieved in vivo ultrasound-switchable fluorescence imaging in mice with high resolution. ICG-encapsulated PNIPAM nanoparticles was adopted as contrast agents which is quite stable in biological environment. Compared with CT imaging results, they found USF imaging maintained high sensitivity and specificity in deep tissue.
