= Hyperpolarization (physics) =

Spin polarization of atomic nuclei beyond thermal equilibrium

Hyperpolarization is the spin polarization of the atomic nuclei of a material in a magnetic field far beyond thermal equilibrium conditions determined by the Boltzmann distribution. It can be applied to gases such as ^{129}Xe and ^{3}He, and small molecules where the polarization levels can be enhanced by a factor of 10^{4}–10^{5} above thermal equilibrium levels. Hyperpolarized noble gases are typically used in magnetic resonance imaging (MRI) of the lungs. Hyperpolarized small molecules are typically used for in vivo metabolic imaging. For example, a hyperpolarized metabolite can be injected into animals or patients and the metabolic conversion can be tracked in real-time. Other applications include determining the function of the neutron spin-structures by scattering polarized electrons from a very polarized target (^{3}He), surface interaction studies, and neutron polarizing experiments.

== Spin-exchange optical pumping ==
=== Introduction ===
Spin exchange optical pumping (SEOP) is one of several hyperpolarization techniques discussed on this page. This technique specializes in creating hyperpolarized (HP) noble gases, such as ^{3}He, ^{129}Xe, and quadrupolar ^{131}Xe, ^{83}Kr, and ^{21}Ne. Noble gases are required because SEOP is performed in the gas phase, they are chemically inert, non-reactive, chemically stable with respect to alkali metals, and their T_{1} is long enough to build up polarization. Spin 1/2 noble gases meet all these requirements, and spin 3/2 noble gases do to an extent, although some spin 3/2 do not have a sufficient T_{1}. Each of these noble gases has their own specific application, such as characterizing lung space and tissue via in vivo molecular imaging and functional imaging of lungs, to study changes in metabolism of healthy versus cancer cells, or use as targets for nuclear physics experiments. During this process, circularly polarized infrared laser light, tuned to the appropriate wavelength, is used to excite electrons in an alkali metal, such as caesium or rubidium inside a sealed glass vessel. Infrared light is necessary because it contains the wavelengths necessary to excite the alkali metal electrons, although the wavelength necessary to excite sodium electrons is below this region (Table 1).

Table 1. Wavelengths required to excite alkali metal electrons.
Alkali Metal	Wavelength (nm)
Sodium	590.0
Rubidium	794.7
Cesium	894.0

The angular momentum is transferred from the alkali metal electrons to the noble gas nuclei through collisions. Nitrogen is used as a quenching gas, which prevents the fluorescence of the polarized alkali metal, which would lead to de-polarization of the noble gas. If fluorescence was not quenched, the light emitted during relaxation would be randomly polarized, working against the circularly polarized laser light. While different sizes of glass vessels (also called cells), and therefore different pressures, are used depending on the application, one amagat of total pressure of noble gas and nitrogen is sufficient for SEOP and 0.1 amagat of nitrogen density is needed to quench fluorescence. Great improvements in ^{129}Xe hyperpolarization technology have achieved > 50% level at flow rates of 1–2 L/min, which enables human clinical applications.

=== History ===
The discovery of SEOP took decades for all the pieces to fall into place to create a complete technique. First, in 1897, Zeeman's studies of sodium vapor led to the first result of optical pumping. The next piece was found in 1950 when Kastler determined a method to electronically spin-polarize rubidium alkali metal vapor using an applied magnetic field and illuminating the vapor with resonant circularly polarized light. Ten years later, Marie-Anne Bouchiat, T. M. Carver, and C. M. Varnum performed spin exchange, in which the electronic spin polarization was transferred to nuclear spins of a noble gas (^{3}He and ^{129}Xe) through gas-phased collisions. Since then, this method has been greatly improved and expanded to use with other noble gases and alkali metals.

=== Theory ===
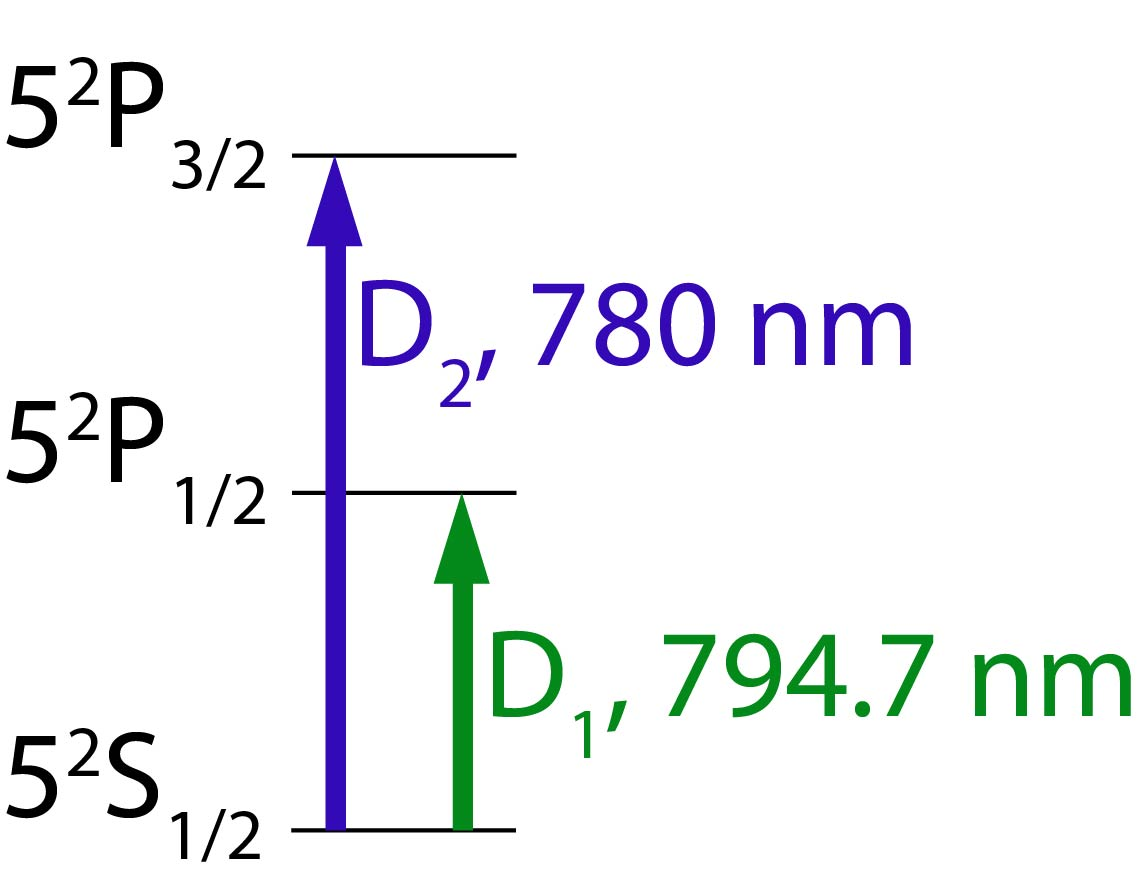
Figure 1. Excitation transitions of a rubidium electron.

To explain the processes of excitation, optical pumping, and spin exchange easier, the most common alkali metal used for this process, rubidium, will be used as an example. Rubidium has an odd number of electrons, with only one in the outermost shell that can be excited under the right conditions. There are two transitions that can occur, one referred to as the D_{1} line where the transition occurs from the 5^{2}S_{1/2} state to the 5^{2}P_{1/2} state and another referred to the D_{2} line where the transition occurs from the 5^{2}S_{1/2} to the 5^{2}P_{3/2} state. The D_{1} and D_{2} transitions can occur if the rubidium atoms are illuminated with light at a wavelength of 794.7 nm and 780 nm, respectively (Figure 1). While it is possible to cause either excitation, laser technology is well-developed for causing the D_{1} transition to occur. Those lasers are said to be tuned to the D_{1} wavelength (794.7 nm) of rubidium.

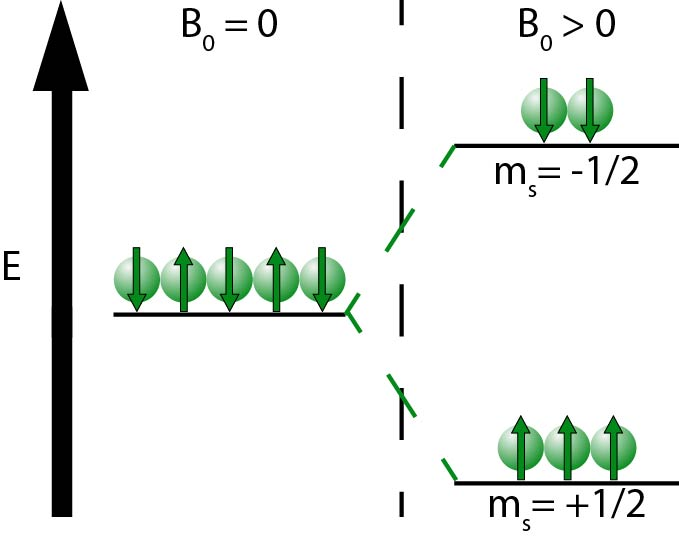
Figure 2. Effect of applied magnetic field on spin where there is energy splitting in the presence of a magnetic field, B_{0}.

In order to increase the polarization level above thermal equilibrium, the populations of the spin states must be altered. In the absence of magnetic field, the two spin states of a spin I = 1/2 nuclei are in the same energy level, but in the presence of a magnetic field, the energy levels split into m_{s} = ±1/2 energy levels (Figure 2). Here, m_{s} is the spin angular momentum with possible values of +1/2 (spin up) or −1/2 (spin down), often drawn as vectors pointing up or down, respectively. The difference in population between these two energy levels is what produces an NMR signal. For example, the two electrons in the spin down state cancel two of the electrons in the spin up state, leaving only one spin up nucleus to be detected with NMR. However, the populations of these states can be altered via hyperpolarization, allowing the spin up energy level to be more populated and therefore increase the NMR signal. This is done by first optically pumping alkali metal, then transferring the polarization to a noble gas nucleus to increase the population of the spin up state.

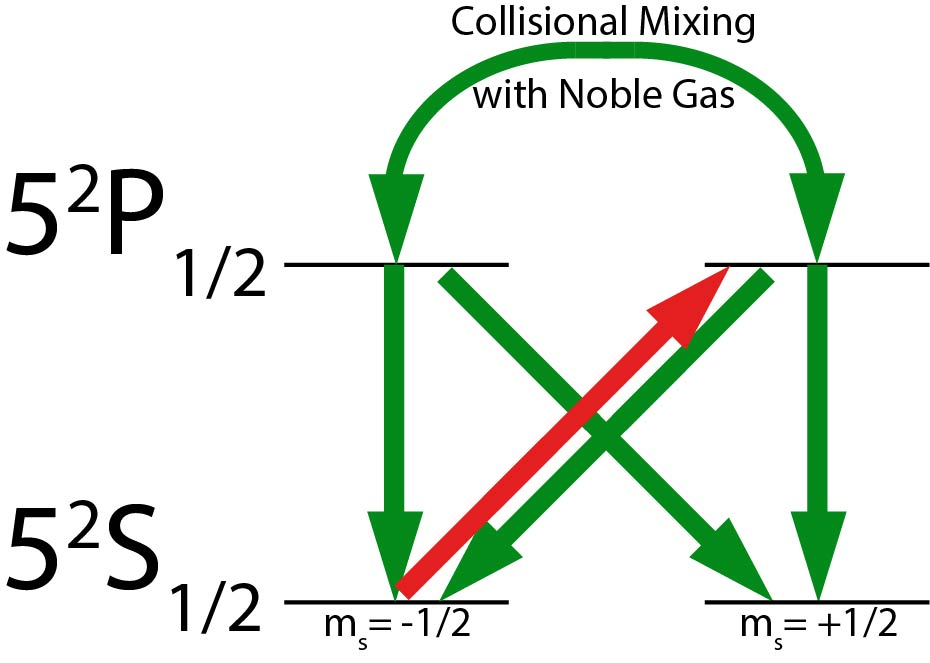
Figure 3. Transitions that occur when circularly polarized light interacts with the alkali metal atoms.

The absorption of laser light by the alkali metal is the first process in SEOP. Left-circularly polarized light tuned to the D_{1} wavelength of the alkali metal excites the electrons from the spin down ^{2}S_{1/2} (m_{s}=−1/2) state into the spin up ^{2}P_{1/2} (m_{s}=+1/2) state, where collisional mixing then occurs as the noble gas atoms collide with the alkali metal atoms and the m_{s}=−1/2 state is partially populated (Figure 3). Circularly polarized light is necessary at low magnetic fields because it allows only one type of angular momentum to be absorbed, allowing the spins to be polarized. Relaxation then occurs from the excited states (m_{s}=±1/2) to the ground states (m_{s}=±1/2) as the atoms collide with nitrogen, thus quenching any chance of fluorescence and causing the electrons to return to the two ground states in equal populations. Once the spins are depolarized (return to the m_{s}=−1/2 state), they are excited again by the continuous wave laser light and the process repeats itself. In this way, a larger population of electron spins in the m_{s}=+1/2 state accumulates. The polarization of the rubidium, P_{Rb}, can be calculated by using the formula below:

$${P_{Rb}}={{\mathrm{n}_\uparrow-\mathrm{n}_\downarrow}\over{\mathrm{n}_\uparrow+\mathrm{n}_\downarrow}}$$

Where n_{↑} and n_{↓} and are the number of atoms in the spin up (m_{S}=+1/2) and spin down (m_{S}=−1/2) ^{2}S_{1/2} states.

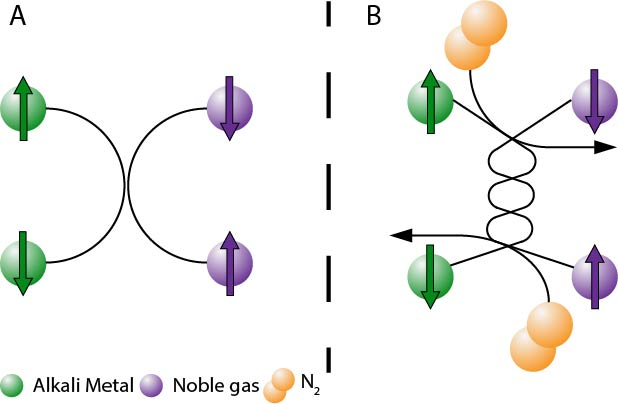
Figure 4. Transfer of polarization via A) binary collisions and B) van der Waals forces.

Next, the optically pumped alkali metal collides with the noble gas, allowing for spin exchange to occur where the alkali metal electron polarization is transferred to the noble gas nuclei (Figure 4). There are two mechanisms in which this can occur. The angular momentum can be transferred via binary collisions (Figure 4A, also called two-body collisions) or while the noble gas, N_{2} buffer gas, and vapor phase alkali metal are held in close proximity via van der Waals forces (Figure 4B, also called three body collisions). In cases where van der Waals forces are very small compared to binary collisions (such is the case for ^{3}He), the noble gas and alkali metal collide and polarization is transferred from the AM to the noble gas. Binary collisions are also possible for ^{129}Xe. At high pressures, van der Waals forces dominate, but at low pressures binary collisions dominate.

=== Buildup of polarization ===
This cycle of excitation, polarization, depolarization, and re-polarization, etc. takes time before a net polarization is achieved. The buildup of nuclear polarization, P_{N}(t), is given by:

$$\mathrm{P}_N(\mathrm{t})=\left \langle\mathrm{P}_A\right \rangle \left ( \frac{\gamma_{SE}}{\gamma_{SE}+\Gamma} \right ) [1-e^{(\gamma_{SE}+\Gamma)\mathrm{t}}]$$

Where ⟨P_{A}⟩ is the alkali metal polarization, γ_{SE} is the spin exchange rate, and Γ is the longitudinal relaxation rate of the noble gas. Relaxation of the nuclear polarization can occur via several mechanisms and is written as a sum of these contributions:

$$\Gamma=\Gamma_t+\Gamma_p+\Gamma_g+\Gamma_w$$

Where Γ_{t}, Γ_{p}, Γ_{g}, and Γ_{w} represent the relaxation from the transient Xe_{2} dimer, the persistent Xe_{2} dimer, diffusion through gradients in the applied magnetic field, and wall relaxation, respectively. In most cases, the largest contributors to the total relaxation are persistent dimers and wall relaxations. A Xe_{2} dimer can occur when two Xe atoms collide and are held together via van der Waals forces, and it can be broken when a third atom collides with it. It is similar to Xe-Rb during spin exchange (spin transfer) where they are held in close proximity to each other via van der Waals forces. Wall relaxation is when the hyperpolarized Xe collides with the walls of the cell and is de-polarized due to paramagnetic impurities in the glass.

The buildup time constant, Γ_{B}, can be measured by collecting NMR spectra at time intervals falling within the time it takes to reach steady-state polarization (i.e. the maximum polarization that can be achieved, seen by the maximum signal output). The signal integrals are then plotted over time and can be fit to obtain the buildup time constant. Collecting a buildup curve at several different temperatures and plotting the values as a function of alkali metal vapor density (since vapor density increases with an increase in cell temperature) can be used to determine the spin destruction rate and the per-atom spin exchange rate using:

$$\Gamma_B=\gamma'\times[AM]+\Gamma_{SD}$$

Where γ' is the per-atom spin exchange rate, [AM] is the alkali metal vapor density, and Γ_{SD} is the spin destruction rate. This plot should be linear, where γ' is the slope and Γ_{SD} is the y-intercept.

=== Relaxation: T_{1} ===
Spin exchange optical pumping can continue indefinitely with continuous illumination, but there are several factors that cause relaxation of polarization and thus a return to the thermal equilibrium populations when illumination is stopped. In order to use hyperpolarized noble gases in applications such as lung imaging, the gas must be transferred from the experimental setup to a patient. As soon as the gas is no longer actively being optically pumped, the degree of hyperpolarization begins to decrease until thermal equilibrium is reached. However, the hyperpolarization must last long enough to transfer the gas to the patient and obtain an image. The longitudinal spin relaxation time, denoted as T_{1}, can be measured easily by collecting NMR spectra as the polarization decreases over time once illumination is stopped. This relaxation rate is governed by several depolarization mechanisms and is written as:

$$\frac{1}{\mathrm{T}_1}=\left ( \frac{1}{T_1} \right )_{CR}+\left ( \frac{1}{T_1} \right )_{MFI}+\left ( \frac{1}{T_1} \right )_{O2}$$

Where the three contributing terms are for collisional relaxation (CR), magnetic field inhomogeneity (MFI) relaxation, and relaxation caused by the presence of paramagnetic oxygen (O2). The T_{1} duration could be anywhere from minutes to several hours, depending on how much care is put into lessening the effects of CR, MFI, and O_{2}. The last term has been quantified to be 0.360 s^{−1} amagat^{−1}, but the first and second terms are hard to quantify since the degree of their contribution to the overall T_{1} is dependent on how well the experimental setup and cell are optimized and prepared.

=== Experimental setup in SEOP ===
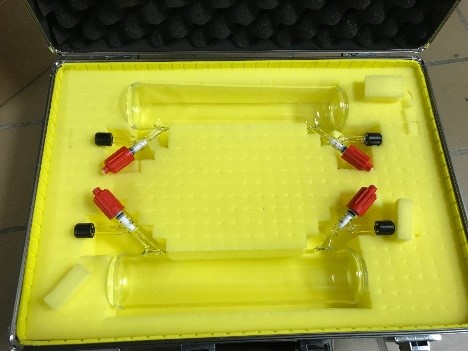
Figure 5. Photo of 2" diameter 10" length optical cells.

In order to perform SEOP, it is first necessary to prepare the optical cell. Optical cells (Figure 5) are designed for the particular system in mind and glass blown using a transparent material, typically pyrex glass (borosilicate). This cell must then be cleaned to eliminate all contaminants, particularly paramagnetic materials which decrease polarization and the T_{1}. The inner surface of the cell is then coated to (a) serve as a protective layer for the glass in order to lessen the chance of corrosion by the alkali metal, and (b) minimize depolarization caused by the collisions of polarized gas molecules with the walls of the cell. Decreasing wall relaxation leads to longer and higher polarization of the noble gas.

Figure 6. Structure of SurfaSil.

While several coatings have been tested over the years, SurfaSil (Figure 6, now referred to as hydrocarbon soluble siliconizing fluid) is the most common coating used in a ratio of 1:10 SurfaSil: hexane because it provides long T_{1} values. The thickness of the SurfaSil layer is about 0.3-0.4 μm. Once evenly coated and dried, the cell is then placed in an inert environment and a droplet of alkali metal (≈200 mg) is placed in the cell, which is then dispersed to create an even coating on the walls of the cells. One method for transferring the alkali metal into the cell is by distillation. In the distillation method, the cell is connected to a glass manifold equipped to hold both pressurized gas and vacuum, where an ampoule of alkali metal is connected. The manifold and cell are vacuumed, then the ampoule seal is broken and the alkali metal is moved into the cell using the flame of a gas torch. The cell is then filled with the desired gas mixture of nitrogen and noble gas. Care must be taken not to poison the cell at any stage of cell preparation (expose the cell to atmospheric air).

Several cell sizes and designs have been used over the years. The application desired is what governs the design of the optical pumping cell and is dependent on laser diameter, optimization needs, and clinical use considerations. The specific alkali metal(s) and gases are also chosen based on the desired applications.

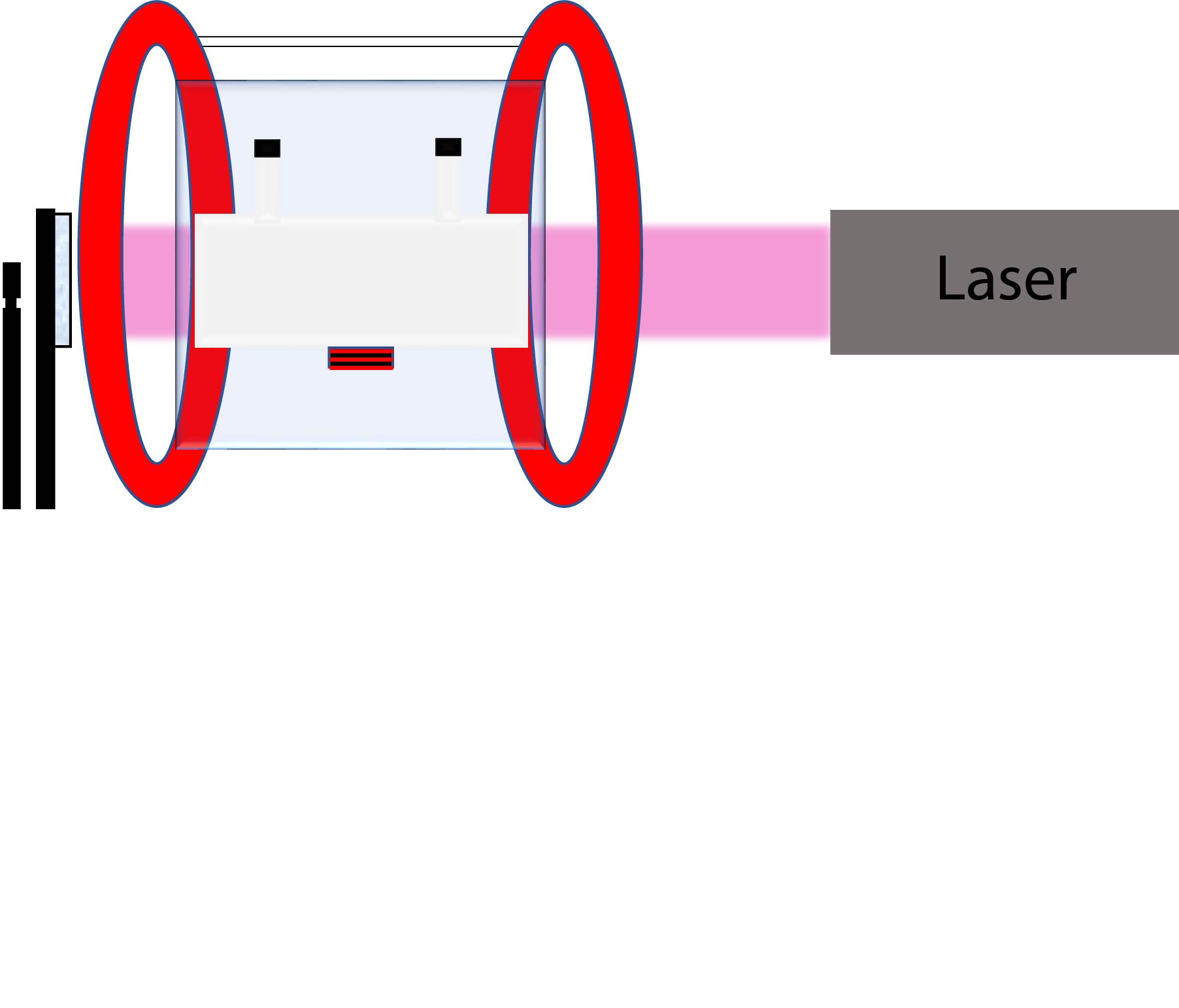
Figure 7. Experimental setup that involves illuminating an optical cell containing alkali metal, a noble gas, and nitrogen gas.

Once the cell is complete, a surface coil (or coils, depending on the desired coil type) is taped to the outside of the cell, which a) allows RF pulses to be produced in order to tip the polarized spins into the detection field (x,y plane) and b) detects the signal produced by the polarized nuclear spins. The cell is placed in an oven which allows for the cell and its contents to be heated so the alkali metal enters the vapor phase, and the cell is centered in a coil system which generates an applied magnetic field (along the z-axis). A laser, tuned to the D_{1} line (electric-dipole transition) of the alkali metal and with a beam diameter matching the diameter of the optical cell, is then aligned with the optical flats of the cell in such a way where the entirety of the cell is illuminated by laser light to provide the largest polarization possible (Figure 7). The laser can be anywhere between tens of watts to hundreds of watts, where higher the power yields larger polarization but is more costly. In order to further increase polarization, a retro-reflective mirror is placed behind the cell in order to pass the laser light through the cell twice. Additionally, an IR iris is placed behind the mirror, providing information of laser light absorption by the alkali metal atoms. When the laser is illuminating the cell, but the cell is at room temperature, the IR iris is used to measure the percent transmittance of laser light through the cell. As the cell is heated, the rubidium enters the vapor phase and starts to absorb laser light, causing the percent transmittance to decrease. The difference in the IR spectrum between a room temperature spectrum and a spectrum taken while the cell is heated can be used to calculate an estimated rubidium polarization value, P_{Rb}.

As SEOP continues to develop and improve, there are several types of NMR coils, ovens, magnetic field generating coils, and lasers that have been and are being used to generate hyperpolarized gases. Generally, the NMR coils are hand made for the specific purpose, either by turning copper wire by hand in the desired shape, or by 3D printing the coil. Commonly, the oven is a forced-air oven, with two faces made of glass for the laser light to pass through the cell, a removable lid, and a hole through which a hot air line is connected, which allows the cell to be heated via conduction. The magnetic field generating coils can be a pair of Helmholtz coils, used to generate the desired magnetic field strength, whose desired field is governed by:

$$\omega=\gamma\mathrm{B}_0$$

Where ω is the Larmour frequency, or desired detection frequency, γ is the gyromagnetic ratio of the nuclei of interest, and B_{0} is the magnetic field required to detect the nuclei at the desired frequency. A set of four electromagnetic coils can also be used (i.e. from Acutran) and other coil designs are being tested.

In the past, laser technology was a limiting factor for SEOP, where only a couple alkali metals could be used due to the lack of, for example, cesium lasers. However, there have been several new developments, including better cesium lasers, higher power, narrower spectral width, etc. which are allowing the reaches of SEOP to increase. Nevertheless, there are several key features required. Ideally, the laser should be continuous wave to ensure the alkali metal and noble gas remains polarized at all times. In order to induce this polarization, the laser light must be circularly polarized in the direction which allows the electrons to become spin polarized. This is done by passing the laser light through a polarizing beam splitter to separate the s and p components, then through a quarter wave plate, which converts the linearly polarized light into circularly polarized light.

=== Noble gases and alkali metals ===
SEOP has successfully been used and is fairly well developed for ^{3}He, ^{129}Xe, and ^{83}Kr for biomedical applications. Additionally, several improvements are under way to get enhanced and interpretable imaging of cancer cells in biomedical science. Studies involving hyperpolarization of ^{131}Xe are underway, piquing the interest of physicists. There are also improvements being made to allow not only rubidium to be utilized in the spin transfer, but also cesium. In principle, any alkali metal can be used for SEOP, but rubidium is usually preferred due to its high vapor pressure, allowing experiments to be carried out at relatively low temperatures (80 °C-130 °C), decreasing the chance of damaging the glass cell. Additionally, laser technology for the alkali metal of choice has to exist and be developed enough get substantial polarization. Previously, the lasers available to excite the D_{1} cesium transition were not well-developed, but they are now becoming more powerful and less expensive. Preliminary studies even show that cesium may provide better results than rubidium, even though rubidium has been the go-to alkali metal of choice for SEOP.

The hyperpolarization method called spin-exchange optical pumping (SEOP) is being used to hyperpolarize noble gases such as Xenon-129 and Helium-3. When an inhaled hyperpolarized gas like 3He or 129Xe is imaged, there is a higher magnetization density of NMR-active molecules in the lung compared to traditional 1H imaging, which improves the MRI images that can be obtained. Unlike proton MRI which reports on anatomical features of lung tissues, XenonMRI reports lung function including gas ventilation, diffusion, and perfusion.

==== Rationale ====
Our target is to identify the infection or disease (cancer, for example) anywhere in our body like cerebral, brain, blood, and fluid, and tissues. This infectious cell is called collectively biomarker. According to the World Health Organization (WHO) and collaborating with United Nations and International Labor organization have convincingly defined the Biomarker as "any substance, structure, or process that can be measured in the body or its products and influence or predict the incidence of outcome or disease". Biomarker has to be quantifiable up-to certain level in biological process in well-being.

One specific example of biomarker is blood cholesterol that is commonly acquainted with us reliable for coronary heart disease; another biomarker is PSA (Prostate-Specific Antigen) and has been contributing to prostate cancer. There are a lot of biomarkers are considering as being cancer: Hepatitis C virus ribonucleic acid (HCV-RNA), International Normalized Ratio (INR), Prothrombin Time (PT), Monoclonal Protein (M protein), Cancer Antigen-125 (CA-125), Human Immunodeficiency Virus -Ribonucleic Acid (HIV RNA), B-type Natriuretic Peptide (BNP).^{27}and Lymphoma cell (Ramos cell lines and Jurkat cell lines) a form of cancer.

Other common biomarkers are breast cancer, Ovarian cancer, Colorectal cancer, Lung cancer and brain tumor.

This disease-causing verdict agent is the biomarker is existing extremely trace amount especially initial state of the disease. Therefore, identifying or getting images of biomarker is tricky and, in few circumstances, uncertain by NMR tech. Hence, we must use the contrasting agent to enhance the images at least to visualize level to Physicians. As molecules of biomarker is less abundant in vivo system. The NMR or MRI experiment provides a very small signal even in some cases, the analyzer can miss the signal peak in data due to the lack in abundance of biomarkers. Therefore, to make sure, to reach the true conclusion about the existence of trouble-causing biomarkers, we need to enhance the probe (contrasting mechanisms) to get the clear peak at the most visible level of peak height as well as the position of the peak in data. If it is possible to gather the acceptable and clearly interpretable data from NMR or MRI experiment by using the contrasting agent, then experts can take a right initial step to recover the patients who already have been suffering from cancer. Among the various technique to get the enhanced data in MRI experiment, SEOP is one of them.

Researchers in SEOP are interested to use the ^{129}Xe. Because ^{129}Xe has a number of favorable facts in NMR Tech. for working as a contrasting agent even over the other novel gases:

- Inert xenon does not show chemical reaction like other metals and non-metals because Xenon's electronic configuration is fully occupied as well as it is not radioactive also.
- To get the solid, liquid state from naturally occurring gaseous state is easy going (figure-8). The solid and liquid state of ^{129}Xe are existing experimentally doable temperature and pressure ranges.
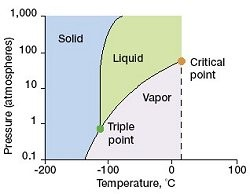
  Figure 8. Diagram above shows the highest temperature and pressure at which xenon gas can exist in liquid and gaseous states simultaneously.30
- Xenon possesses highly polarizable electron cloud surrounding the nucleus. Therefore, easily prone to be soluble with lipid or organic compounds especially in vivo environment in biological respect. (table-2)
- Xenon does not alter the structurally or chemically (similarly other noble gases) when interacting with other molecules.
- According to the scientist Ostwald, solubility is defined as the partition coefficient of the gas absorbed to the volume of the absorbing liquid. The solubility of Xenon, S_{Xe(g)} = V _{absorbed amount of Xe(g)} /V _{absorbing liquid} at standard temperature and pressure (STP).

Solubility of Xenon in water medium 11% means at 25 °C 11 mL Xenon gas could be absorbed by 100 mL of water.

Table 2. Solubility values for ^{129}Xe in different media according to the Ostwald Law for Solubility of a component.
Name of Solvent Compound	Temperature (°C)	Ostwald Solubility in (v/v)%
Water	25	0.11
Hexane	25	4.8
Benzene	25	3.1
Fluorobenzene	25	3.3
Carbon Disulfide	25	4.2
Water	37	0.08
Saline	37	0.09
Plasma	37	0.10
Erythorcytes (98%)	37	0.20
Human albumin (100% extrapolated)	37	0.15
Blood	37	0.14
Oil	37	1.90
Fat tissue	37	1.30
DMSO	37	0.66
Intralipid (20%)	37	0.40
PFOB (perflubron)	37	1.20
PFOB (90% w/v, estimated)	37	0.62

- Xenon atomic size is large and outer shell electrons are far from the nuclei, outermost electron is highly prone to be polarized specially lipid environment. Table 2 shows Xenon solubility in water medium at 37 °C is 8% but fat tissue in vivo environment the solubility value is 130%. Solubility leads the Xenon using in biological system as a contrasting agent.
- Solvent effect of xenon is very large for of ^{129}Xenon by the fact of solubility (table 2). Chemical shift value range for Xenon is more than 7500 ppm. However solvent effect is limited range for ^{1}H & ^{13}C (MRI active nuclei) because of low chemical shift value range for ^{1}H is 20 ppm and for ^{13}C is 300 ppm. Therefore, using the ^{129}Xe is preferred.

Figure-9 below, In NMR experimental data, there are different chemical shift values for different tissues in in vivo environment. All peaks are positioned through such a big range of chemical shift values for ^{129}Xe is viable. Because ^{129}Xe has long range up-to 1700ppm chemical shift value range in NMR data. Other important spectral information includes:

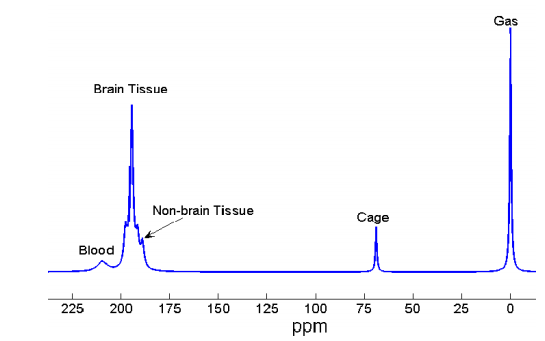

Figure 9. NMR data for Xe-129 biosensor in in vivo biological system.

- Naturally ^{129}Xe NMR peak has been counted as reference at 0.0ppm.
- When ^{129}Xe incorporated and bind with the Cryptophane-A molecule, then the chemical shift value in NMR acquisition shifted to around 70ppm.
- If hyperpolarized ^{129}Xe gas is dissolved into the brain, then five NMR spectral peaks can be observed.
- Among them top sharp peak at 194.7ppm. In addition, at 189 ppm peak come out from the non-brain tissues.
- Another two peaks are still unknown at 191.6 ppm and 197.8 ppm. At 209.5 ppm smaller but broad peak has been found in NMR data when ^{129}Xe was dissolved in the blood stream.
- Hyperpolarized ^{129}Xe is very sensitive detector of biomarker (form of cancer in living system).
- The nuclear spin polarization of ^{129}Xe or in generally for noble gases we can increase up to fivefold via SEOP technique.
- Using SEOP hyperpolarization technique, we can get images of uptake of xenon in the human brain tissue.

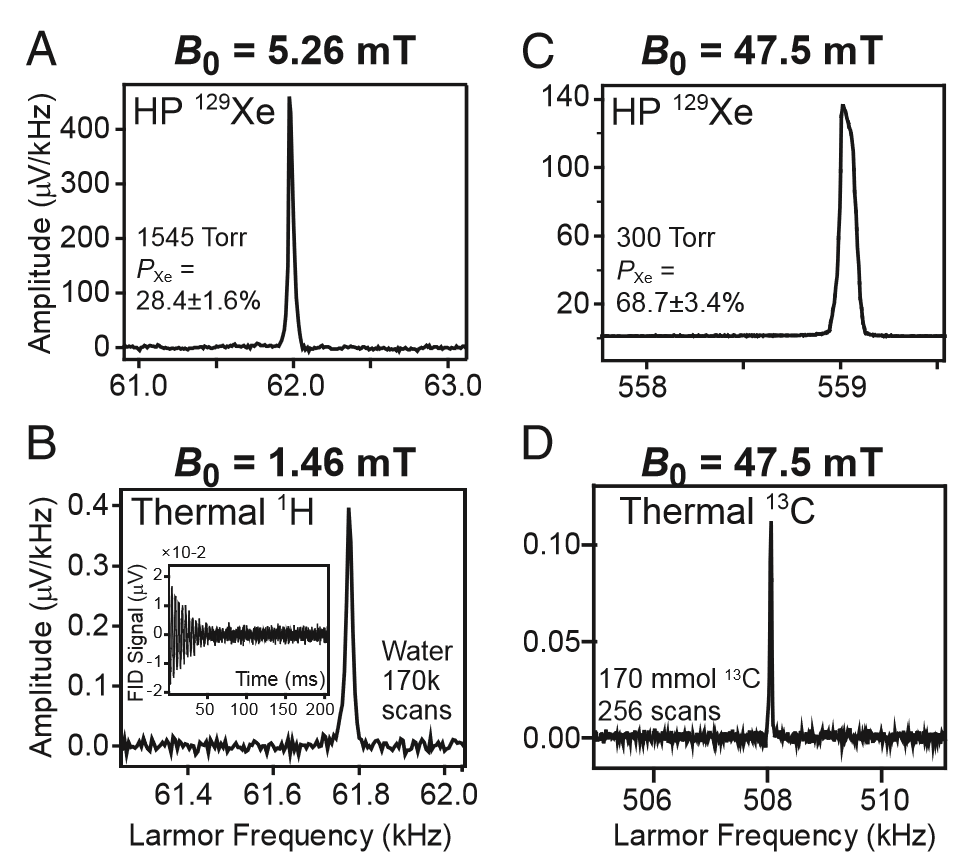
Figure 10. Measurements of the Polarization of ^{129}Xe(g) in presence of low and intermediate magnetic fields. All (A-D) figures are NMR signal amplitude in μV/KHz vs Larmor Frequency in KHz. (A) Enhanced ^{129}Xe(g) NMR signal at 62 kHz Larmor Frequency from the SEOP cell; Xenon(g) has 1545 torr and Nitrogen(g) has 455 torr pressure and NMR data was collected in presence of 5.26mT magnetic field. (B) Reference NMR signal for water Proton Spin (111M), doping with CuSO_{4.} 5H_{2}O(s), 5.0mM and polarization has been created thermally in presence of 1.46 mT magnetic fields (number of scans was 170,000 times). (C) NMR data for Hyperpolarized ^{129}Xe was collected in presence of 47.5mT magnetic fields.(^{129}Xe was 300 torr and N_{2} was 1700 torr).(D) Reference NMR signal for ^{13}C was collected from 170.0mM CH_{3}COONa(l) in presence of 47.5mT magnetic field.^{32}

(Figure-10) ^{129}Xe_{(g)} shows satisfactory enhancement in polarization during SEOP compared to the thermal enhancement in polarization. This is demonstrated by the experimental data values when NMR spectra are acquired at different magnetic field strengths. A couple of important points from experimental data are:

- The ^{129}Xe polarization has increased about 144,000-fold in SEOP tech. over thermally enhanced for ^{1}H polarization in NMR experiment. Both experiments that showed this have been done in identical conditions and using same radio frequency during NMR experiment.
- A similar value of 140,000-fold signal enhancement for ^{129}Xe hyperpolarization in SEOP compare to the reference thermally enhanced ^{13}C NMR signal is also seen in experimental NMR data. Both data have been collected in identical Larmor frequency and other experimental conditions and same radio frequency during NMR data collection.

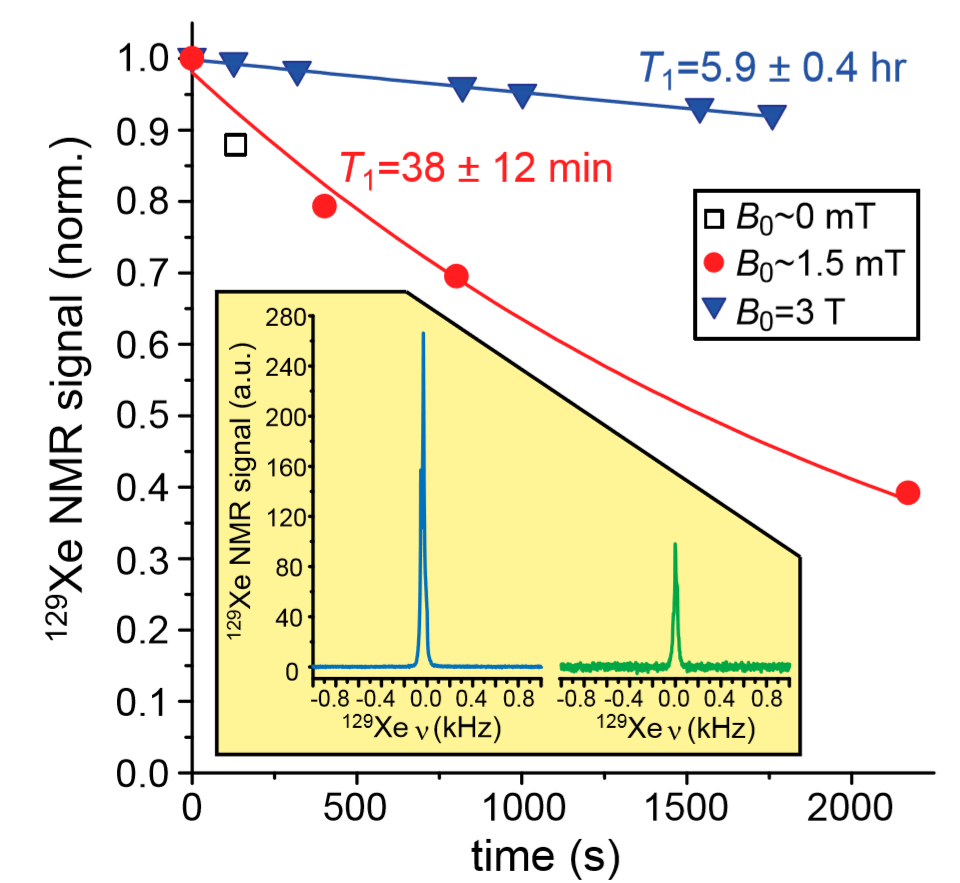
Figure 11. ^{129}Xe(g) MRI studying in presence of high field vs T_{1}(longitudinal Spin Relaxation Time) during the decaying of hyperpolarization of ^{129}Xe(g) in presence of magnetic field different strengths; 3.0 T for blue triangle, approximately 1.5 mT for red circles and approximately 0.0 mT for white squares. Hyperpolarized ^{129}Xe(g) has transferred to kids bags then counted the decay time T_{1} in presence of different magnetic fields separately. Increasing the magnetic field strength (1.5mT to 3000mT) causing the decay time approximately up to eight-fold increments.

(Figure 11) Longitudinal spin relaxation time (T_{1}) is very sensitive with an increase of magnetic field and hence enhance the NMR signals is noticeable in SEOP in case of ^{129}Xe. As T_{1} is higher for blue marking conditioning NMR experiment shows more enhanced peak compare to other. For hyperpolarized ^{129}Xe in tedlar bags, the T_{1} is 38±12 minutes when data collected in presence of 1.5 mT magnetic field. However, satisfactory increment in T_{1}delay time (354±24 minutes) when data was collected in presence of 3000 mT magnetic field.

==== Use of Rb vs. Cs in SEOP NMR experiments ====
In general, we can use the either ^{87}Rb or ^{133}Cs alkali metal atoms with inert nitrogen gas. However, we are using ^{133}Cs atoms with nitrogen to make the spin exchange with ^{129}Xe for number of advantages:

- ^{133}Cs has natural perfect abundance while rubidium has two (^{85}Rb and ^{87}Rb) isotopes. Abstraction of one isotope separately from these two (^{85}Rb and ^{87}Rb) is difficult compare to collect the ^{133}Cs isotope. Abstraction of ^{133}Cs is convenient.
- Optical pumping cell normally is operated at lower temperature to avoid chemically breakdown issue. SEOP is using ^{133}Cs at low temperature and hence it has fewer chemical corrosion with SEOP cell wall glass.
- ^{133}Cs-^{129}Xe couple have spin exchange rate about 10% that is more compare to the ^{87}Rb-^{129}Xe couple have.

Although ^{129}Xe has a bunch of preferable characteristic applications in NMR technique, ^{83}Kr can also be used since it has a lot of advantages in NMR techniques in different ways than ^{129}Xe.

- ^{83}Kr stable isotope has spin I=9/2 and has larger Van der Waals size 2.02A^{0}. It has quadrupolar effect can be diffuse to nearby environment shortly & distinctively (polar to nonpolar media in vivo system).
- Chemical composition of materials can influence the longitudinal relaxation of hyperpolarized ^{83}Kr.
- The relaxation can distinguish among the hydrophobic and hydrophilic substrate. Although ^{3}He and ^{129}Xe have spin half but they are not quadrupolar active.
- However, the ^{21}Ne (I=3/2), ^{83}Kr(I=9/2) and ^{131}Xe (I=3/2) have Quadrupolar moment.^{34} Quadrupolar interactions make these isotopes having spin relaxation.
- Due to this spin relaxation and evolution, these isotopes can be used as contrasting agents to say about the probe can determine the structural feature and chemical compositions of the surfaces for a permeable media.
- SEOP can calculate the relaxation of spin T_{1} by using the equation nonlinear least-squares fitting for ^{83}Kr signal as a function of time as well as experimental number of media flip angle (≈12°) for NMR experimenting radio frequency pulses.
- Hyperpolarized ^{83}Kr is being separated from ^{87}Rb gases after spin exchanging in the optical pumping process and then used in variety of in vivo system to get MRI signal. This is the first isotope showed lots of applicability for MRI technique even though has the spin is 9 1/2.
- During experiment of canine lung tissue, the using magnet was 9.4 T, media was porous and similar porosity to alveolar dimensions which is disseminated at atmospheric pressure. Spin lattice relaxation was reasonably long enough so it is applicable in vivo system although the oxygen level could be 20%.
- As ^{83}Kr contrasting agent is promising to develop pristine in vivo MRI methodology to identify the lung diseases epically those effect have been caused in parenchyma surface due to the surfactant concentration.
- Boyed the boundary this particular contrasting agent can work to figure out the size of pour of porous media in materials science.
- In addition, this technique can take us about to prepare the surface coating, spatial fluctuations of surfaces. Eventually, never ending the good sign of this contrasting agent like natural abundance (11.5% of ^{83}Kr) makes it easy to get with reasonable price $5/L.

=== Imaging applications of SEOP ===
Steps are also being taken in academia and industry to use this hyperpolarized gas for lung imaging. Once the gas (^{129}Xe) is hyperpolarized through the SEOP process and the alkali metal is removed, a patient (either healthy or suffering from a lung disease), can breathe in the gas and an MRI can be taken. This results in an image of the spaces in the lungs filled with the gas. While the process to get to the point of imaging the patient may require knowledge from scientists very familiar with this technique and the equipment, steps are being taken to eliminate the need for this knowledge so that a hospital technician would be able to produce the hyperpolarized gas using a polarizer.

Hyperpolarization machines are currently being used to develop hyperpolarized xenon gas that is used as a visualization agent for the lungs. Xenon-129 is a safe inert noble gas that can be used to quantify lung function. With a single 10-second breath hold, hyperpolarized Xenon-129 is used with MRI to enable 3-dimensional lung imaging. Xenon MRI is being used to monitor patients with pulmonary-vascular, obstructive, or fibrotic lung disease.

Temperature-ramped ^{129}Xe SEOP in an automated high-output batch model hyperpolarized ^{129}Xe can utilize three prime temperature range to put certain conditions: First, ^{129}Xe hyperpolarization rate is superlative high at hot condition. Second, in warm condition the hyperpolarization of ^{129}Xe is unity. Third, at cold condition, the level of hyperpolarization of ^{129}Xe gas at least can get the (at human body's temperature) imaging although during the transferring into the Tedlar bag having poor percentage of ^{87}Rb (less than 5 ng/L dose).

Multiparameter analysis of ^{87}Rb/^{129}Xe SEOP at high xenon pressure and photon flux could be used as 3D-printing and stopped flow contrasting agent in clinical scale. In situ technique, the NMR machine was run for tracking the dynamics of ^{129}Xe polarization as a function of SEOP-cell conditioning with different operating parameters such as data collecting temperature, photon flux, and ^{129}Xe partial pressure to enhance the ^{129}Xe polarization (P_{Xe}).

Table 3. ^{129}Xe polarization values for different partial pressures.
P_{Xe}	95±9%	73±4%	60±2%	41±1%	31±1%
Partial pressure of Xe (torr)	275	515	1000	1500	2000

All of those polarization values of ^{129}Xe has been approved by pushing the hyperpolarized ^{129}Xe gas and all MRI experiment also done at lower magnetic field 47.5 mT. Finally demonstrations indicated that such a high pressure region, polarization of ^{129}Xe gases could be increment even more that the limit that already has been shown. Better SEOP thermal management and optimizing the polarizing kinetics has been further improved with good efficacy.

=== SEOP on solids ===
Not only can SEOP be used to hyperpolarize noble gases, but a more recent development is SEOP on solids. It was first performed in 2007 and was used to polarize nuclei in a solid, allowing for nuclei that cannot be polarized by other methods to become hyperpolarized. For example, nuclear polarization of ^{133}Cs in the form of a solid film of CsH can be increased above the Boltzmann limit. This is done by first optically pumping cesium vapor, then transferring the spin polarization to CsH salt, yielding an enhancement of 4.0.

The cells are made as previously described using distillation, then filled with hydrogen gas and heated to allow for the Cs metal to react with the gaseous hydrogen to form the CsH salt. Unreacted hydrogen was removed, and the process was repeated several times to increase the thickness of the CsH film, then pressurized with nitrogen gas. Usually, SEOP experiments are done with the cell centered in Helmholtz or electromagnetic coils, as previously described, but these experiments were done in a superconducting 9.4 T magnet by shining the laser through the magnet and electrically heating the cell. In the future, it may be possible to use this technique to transfer polarization to ^{6}Li or ^{7}Li, leading to even more applications since the T_{1} is expected to be longer. Since the discovery of this technique that allows solids to be characterized, it has been improved in such a way where polarized light is not necessary to polarize the solid; instead, unpolarized light in a magnetic field can be used. In this method, glass wool is coated with CsH salt, increasing the surface area of the CsH and therefore increasing the chances of spin transfer, yielding 80-fold enhancements at low field (0.56 T). Like in hyperpolarizing CsH film, the cesium metal in this glass wool method was allowed to react with hydrogen gas, but in this case the CsH formed on the glass fibers instead of the glass cell.

== Metastability exchange optical pumping ==
^{3}He can also be hyperpolarized using metastability exchange optical pumping (MEOP). This process is able to polarize ^{3}He nuclei in the ground state with optically pumped ^{3}He nuclei in the metastable state. MEOP only involves ^{3}He nuclei at room temperature and at low pressure (≈a few mbars). The process of MEOP is very efficient (high polarization rate), however, compression of the gas up to atmospheric pressure is needed.

== Dynamic nuclear polarization ==
Compounds containing NMR-sensitive nuclei, such as ^{1}H, ^{13}C or ^{15}N, can be hyperpolarized using Dynamic nuclear polarization (DNP). DNP is typically performed at low temperature (≈1 K) and high magnetic field (≈3 T). The compound is subsequently thawed and dissolved to yield a room temperature solution containing hyperpolarized nuclei. This liquid can be used in in vivo metabolic imaging for oncology and other applications. The ^{13}C polarization levels in solid compounds can reach up to ≈64% and the losses during dissolution and transfer of the sample for NMR measurements can be minimized to a few percent. Compounds containing NMR-active nuclei can also be hyperpolarized using chemical reactions with para-hydrogen, see Para-Hydrogen Induced Polarization (PHIP).

== Parahydrogen induced polarization ==
Molecular hydrogen, H_{2}, contains two different spin isomers, para-hydrogen and ortho-hydrogen, with a ratio of 25:75 at room temperature. Creating para-hydrogen induced polarization (PHIP) means that this ratio is increased, in other words that para-hydrogen is enriched. This can be accomplished by cooling hydrogen gas and then inducing ortho-to-para conversion via an iron-oxide or charcoal catalyst. When performing this procedure at ≈70 K (i.e. with liquid nitrogen), para-hydrogen is enriched from 25% to ca. 50%. When cooling to below 20 K and then inducing the ortho-to-para conversion, close to 100% parahydrogen can be obtained.

For practical applications, the PHIP is most commonly transferred to organic molecules by reacting the hyperpolarized hydrogen with precursor molecules in the presence of a transition metal catalyst. Proton NMR signals with ca. 10,000-fold increased intensity can be obtained compared to NMR signals of the same organic molecule without PHIP and thus only "thermal" polarization at room temperature.

== Signal amplification by reversible exchange (SABRE) ==
Signal amplification by reversible exchange (SABRE) is a technique to hyperpolarize samples without chemically modifying them. Compared to orthohydrogen or organic molecules, a much greater fraction of the hydrogen nuclei in parahydrogen align with an applied magnetic field. In SABRE, a metal center reversibly binds to both the test molecule and a parahydrogen molecule facilitating the target molecule to pick up the polarization of the parahydrogen. This technique can be improved and utilized for a wide range of organic molecules by using an intermediate "relay" molecule like ammonia. The ammonia efficiently binds to the metal center and picks up the polarization from the parahydrogen. The ammonia then transfers it other molecules that don't bind as well to the metal catalyst. This enhanced NMR signal allows the rapid analysis of very small amounts of material.

== See also ==
- Dynamic nuclear polarization
- Electron paramagnetic resonance
- Hyperpolarized carbon-13 MRI
