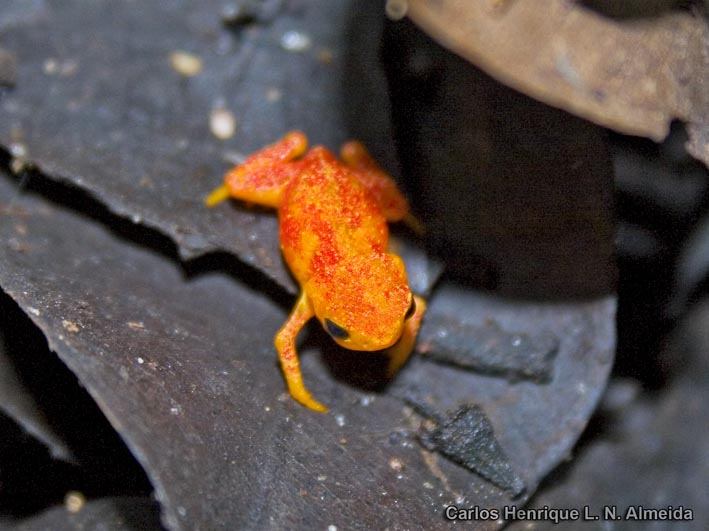

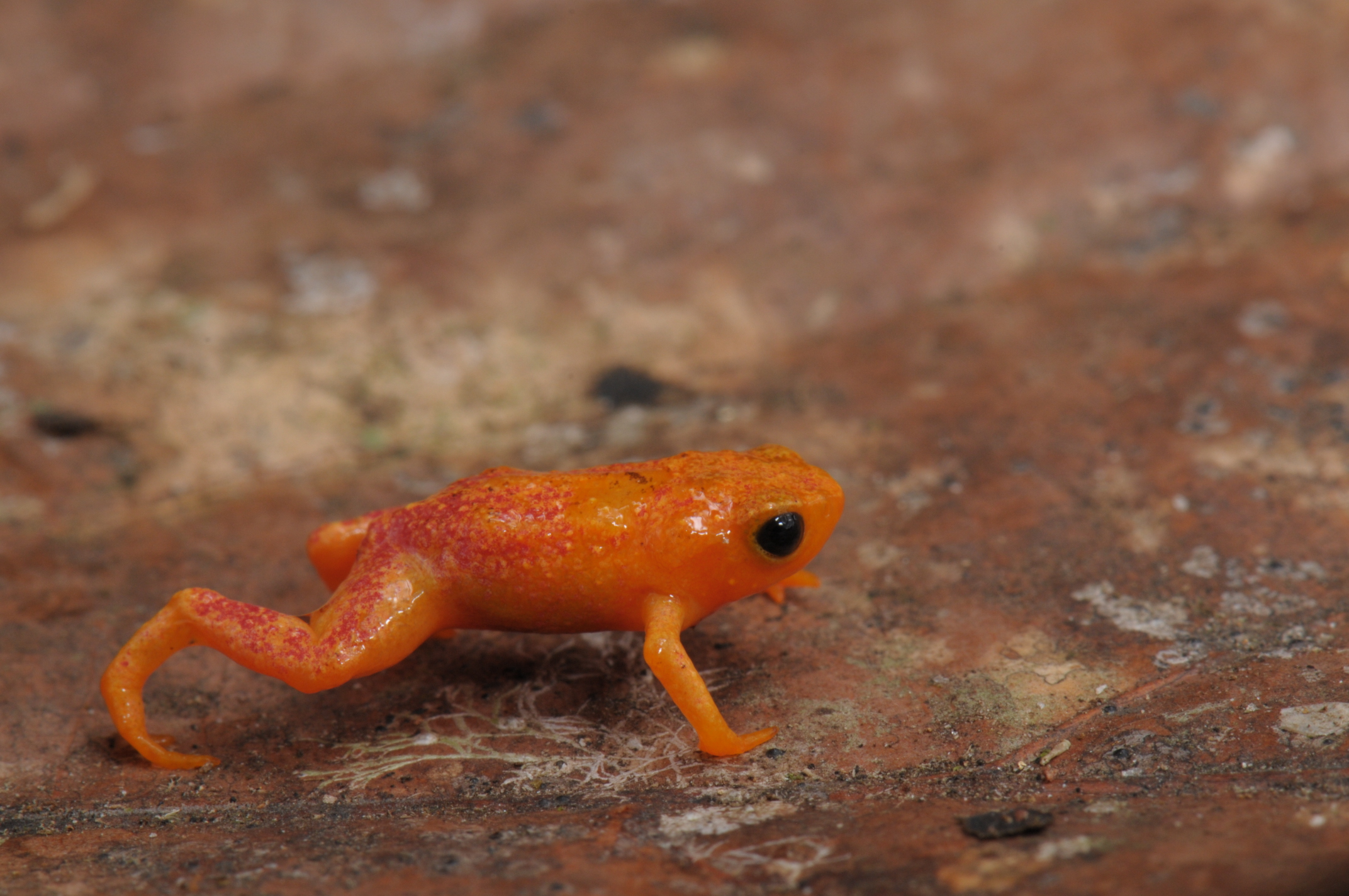

Scientific classification
- Kingdom: Animalia
- Phylum: Chordata
- Class: Amphibia
- Order: Anura
- Family: Brachycephalidae
- Genus: Brachycephalus
- Species: B. pitanga

Binomial name
- Brachycephalus pitanga Alves, Sawaya, Reis & Haddad, 2009

= Brachycephalus pitanga =

Species of amphibian

Brachycephalus pitanga, the red pumpkin toadlet, is a small and brightly coloured species of anuran in the family Brachycephalidae. It is endemic to Atlantic rainforests in São Paulo state of southeastern Brazil, and only known from four localities at an altitude of 900–1,140 m (2,950–3,740 ft) in Ubatuba (the type locality) and São Luiz do Paraitinga. It can be very common where found, and two of the known localities are protected by the Serra do Mar State Park. Unlike many other pumpkin toadlets (genus Brachycephalus), the red pumpkin toadlet is not considered threatened.

== Appearance ==
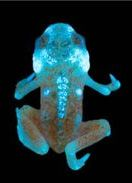
Fluorescent B. pitanga under UV-light

Although very small with a snout–to–vent length of 10.8–12.1 mm (0.43–0.48 in) in adult males and 12.6–14 mm (0.50–0.55 in) in adult females, the red pumpkin toadlet is a medium-sized species of Brachycephalus.

It is overall orange, but with irregular red markings above. The extent of these marking vary greatly; from individuals where there are almost none (they are almost entirely orange throughout) to individuals where the upperparts are almost entirely red. Its specific name pitanga was chosen because it means "red-coloured" in the Tupi–Guarani languages. The bright colours are considered aposematic; although it has not been studied in the red pumpkin toadlet, the closely related and also brightly coloured B. ephippium and B. pernix have tetrodotoxin and similar toxins in their skin and organs.

The red pumpkin toadlet and its close relative B. ephippium have bones that are fluorescent, which is visible through their skin when exposed to UV light. It was initially speculated that the fluorescent colour also is aposematic or that it is related to mate choice (species recognition or determining fitness of a potential partner), but later studies indicate that the former explanation is unlikely, as predation attempts on the toadlets appear to be unaffected by the presence/absence of fluorescence.

== Behavior, voice and hearing ==
The red pumpkin toadlet is diurnal and live in leaf litter on the rainforest floor. During dry weather they mostly remain hidden and there is little activity, but during the wet season and high humidity they can be seen walking on top of the leaf litter.

Calling by adults of both sexes and juveniles can be heard year-round, but follows the same wet/dry pattern as their general activity. Peculiarly, this species and its close relative B. ephippium are unable to hear the frequency of their own advertising calls, as their ears are underdeveloped. Instead their communication appears to rely on certain movements like the vocal sac that inflates when calling, mouth gaping and waving of their arms. It is speculated that their calling is a vestigiality from the ancestral form of the genus, whereas their reduced hearing ability (they do have some hearing ability in frequencies outside their call) is a novel change in these species. Sounds make them more vulnerable to predators, but there has likely been little direct evolutionary pressure to lose it because of their (confirmed in B. ephippium, presumed in B. pitanga) toxicity.

== See also ==
- Polka-dot tree frog (Hypsiboas punctatus) — the first frog discovered to be fluorescent, in 2017
