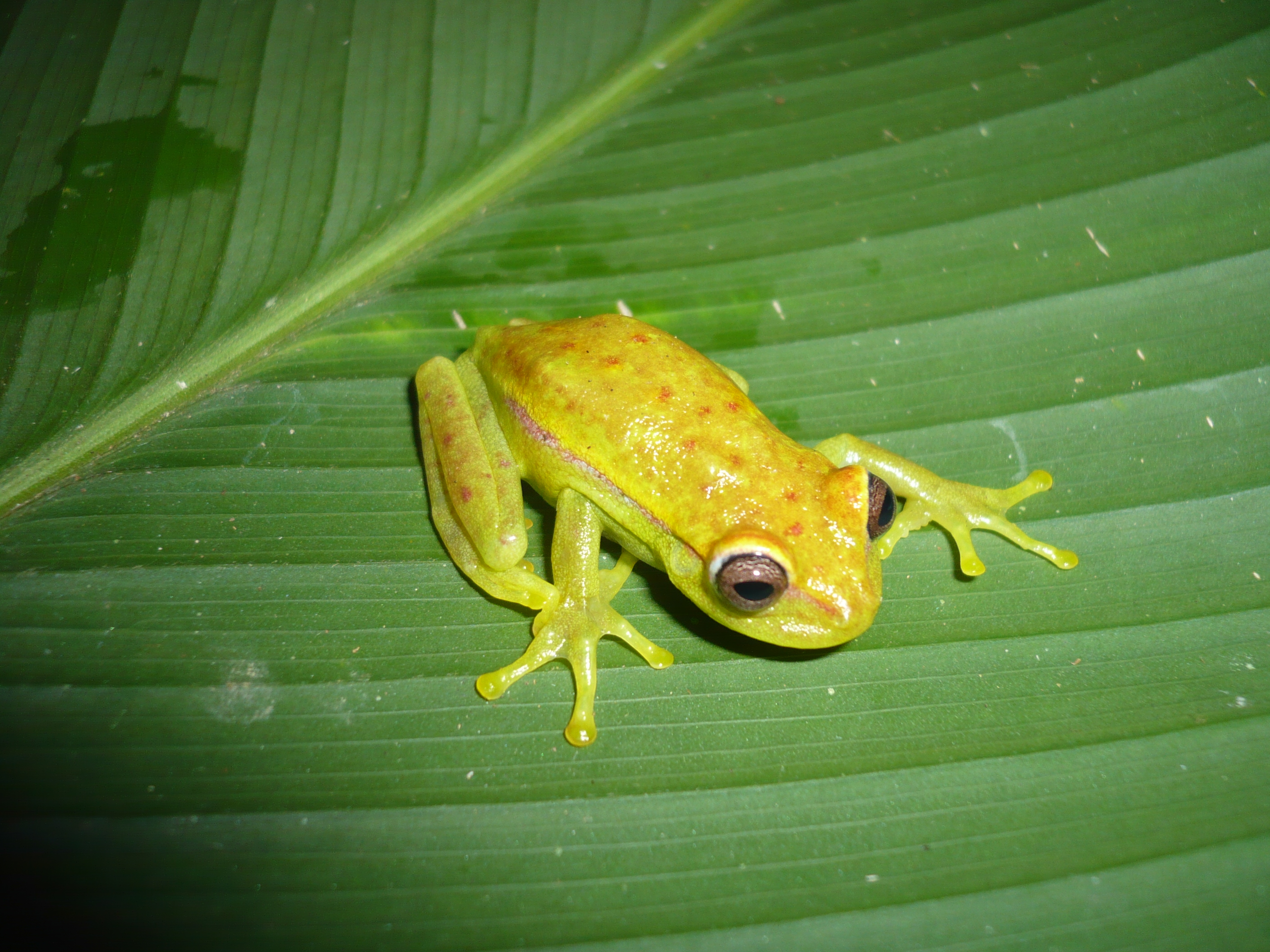

Conservation status
- Least Concern (IUCN 3.1)

Scientific classification
- Kingdom: Animalia
- Phylum: Chordata
- Class: Amphibia
- Order: Anura
- Family: Hylidae
- Genus: Boana
- Species: B. punctata

Binomial name
- Boana punctata (Schneider, 1799)
- Range in green

Synonyms
- Hypsiboas punctatus (Schneider, 1799)

= Polka-dot tree frog =

Species of amphibian

The polka-dot tree frog (Boana punctata), also known as the dotted tree frog, is a frog species in the family Hylidae found in much of South America and also in Trinidad and Tobago. It is fairly small with a snout–to–vent length of c. 3–4 cm (1.2–1.6 in).

Its natural habitats are subtropical or tropical dry forest, subtropical or tropical moist lowland forest, subtropical or tropical swamps, subtropical or tropical moist montane forest, swamps, freshwater marshes, intermittent freshwater marshes, rural gardens, urban areas, and heavily degraded former forests. It is not considered threatened by the IUCN.

== Pigmentation and skin fluorescence ==
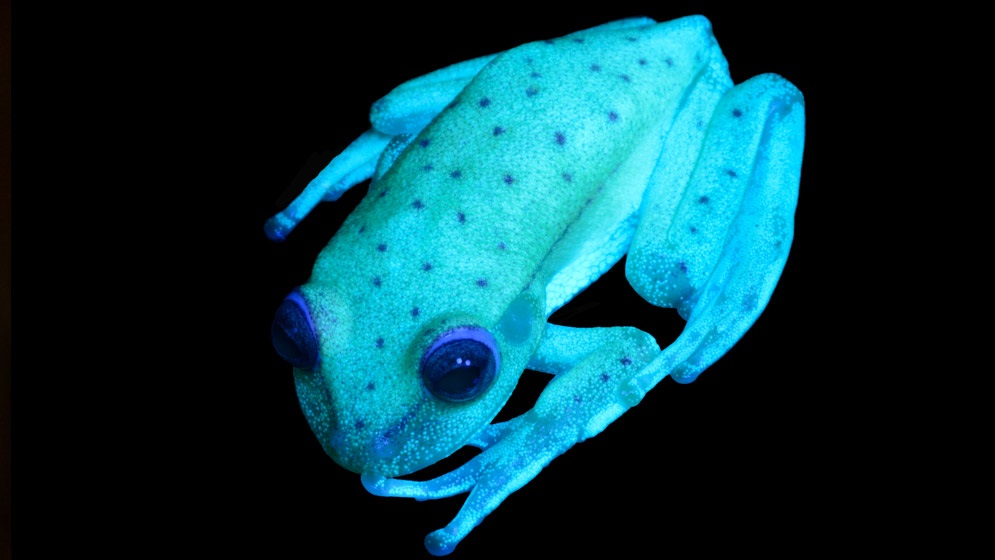
Fluorescent polka-dot tree frog under UV-light

In 2017, several polka-dot tree frogs collected in the Santa Fe Province in Argentina were the first amphibian, amongst more than 6,000 species of frog, identified as naturally fluorescent. Among land-living vertebrates, it had only been confirmed earlier in certain parrots (as opposed to fish and invertebrates where fluorescence is relatively widespread). A few months later, fluorescence was discovered in the closely related Boana atlantica, and in 2019 it was discovered in the distantly related pumpkin toadlet (Brachycephalus ephippium) and red pumpkin toadlet (B. pitanga). In 2020, it was confirmed that fluorescence is relatively widespread among frogs and other amphibians.

When exposed to ultra-violet light, the skin of the polka-dot tree frog emits a bright green fluorescent glow. The discovery was made accidentally when the researchers checked the skin secretions of the frog under UV light. They expected only a faint red fluorescence, because the frog skin contains biliverdin, a green tetrapyrrolic bile pigment responsible for its dull mottled browny-green colour. The surprising green fluorescence is attributed to hyloin compounds, mainly hyloin-L1, hyloin-L2 and hyloin-G1. These fluorescent molecules, in the dihydroisoquinolinone family and derived from the isoquinoline (a benzene ring fused to a pyridine ring), in an alkaloid protecting mucous membrane, have been identified in the lymph tissue, skin and glandular secretions of the frog. Because it is linked to secretions from skin glands, they can also leave fluorescent markings on surfaces where they have been.

The fluorescence intensity represents about 18−29% of the luminosity under twilight conditions and is suspected to play a possible role in the communication, camouflage and mating of the frog.

== Gallery ==
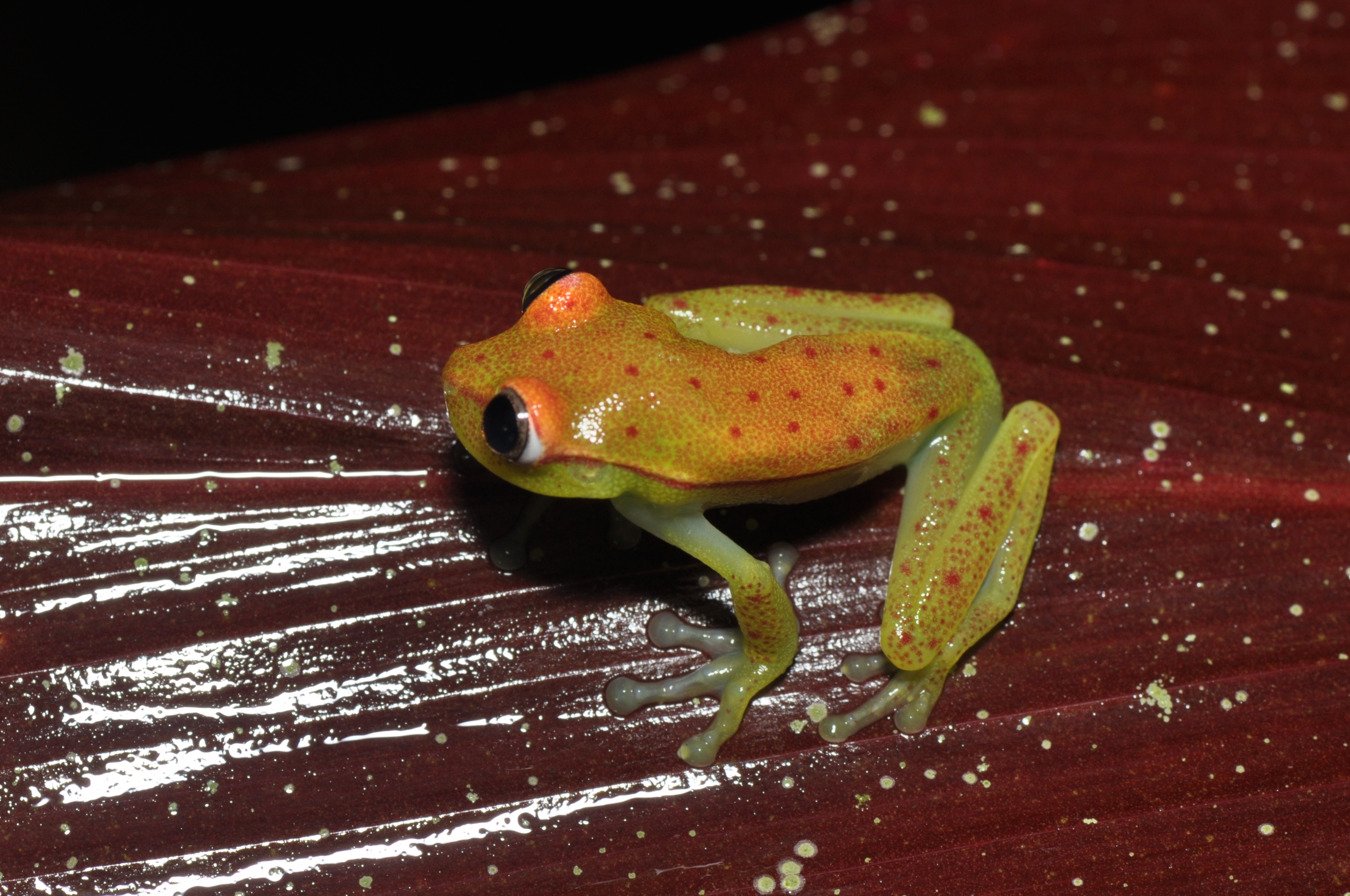

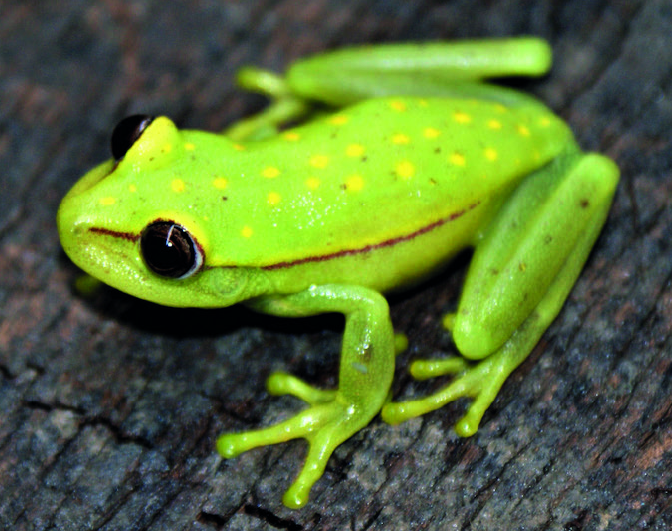
Amapá, Brazil

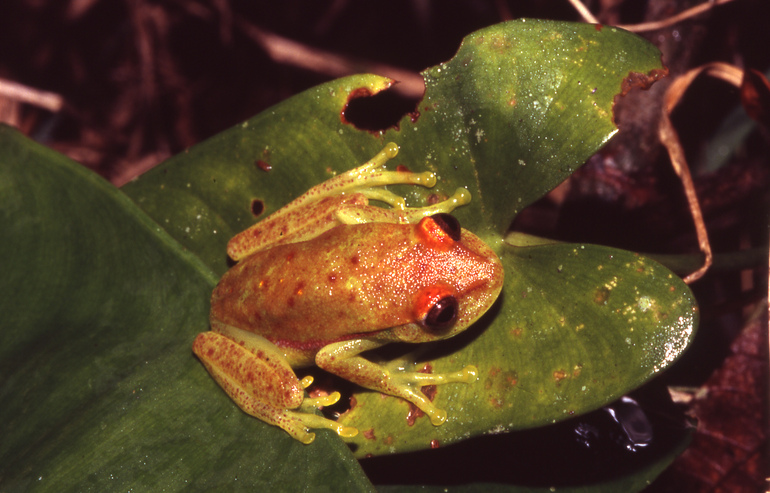

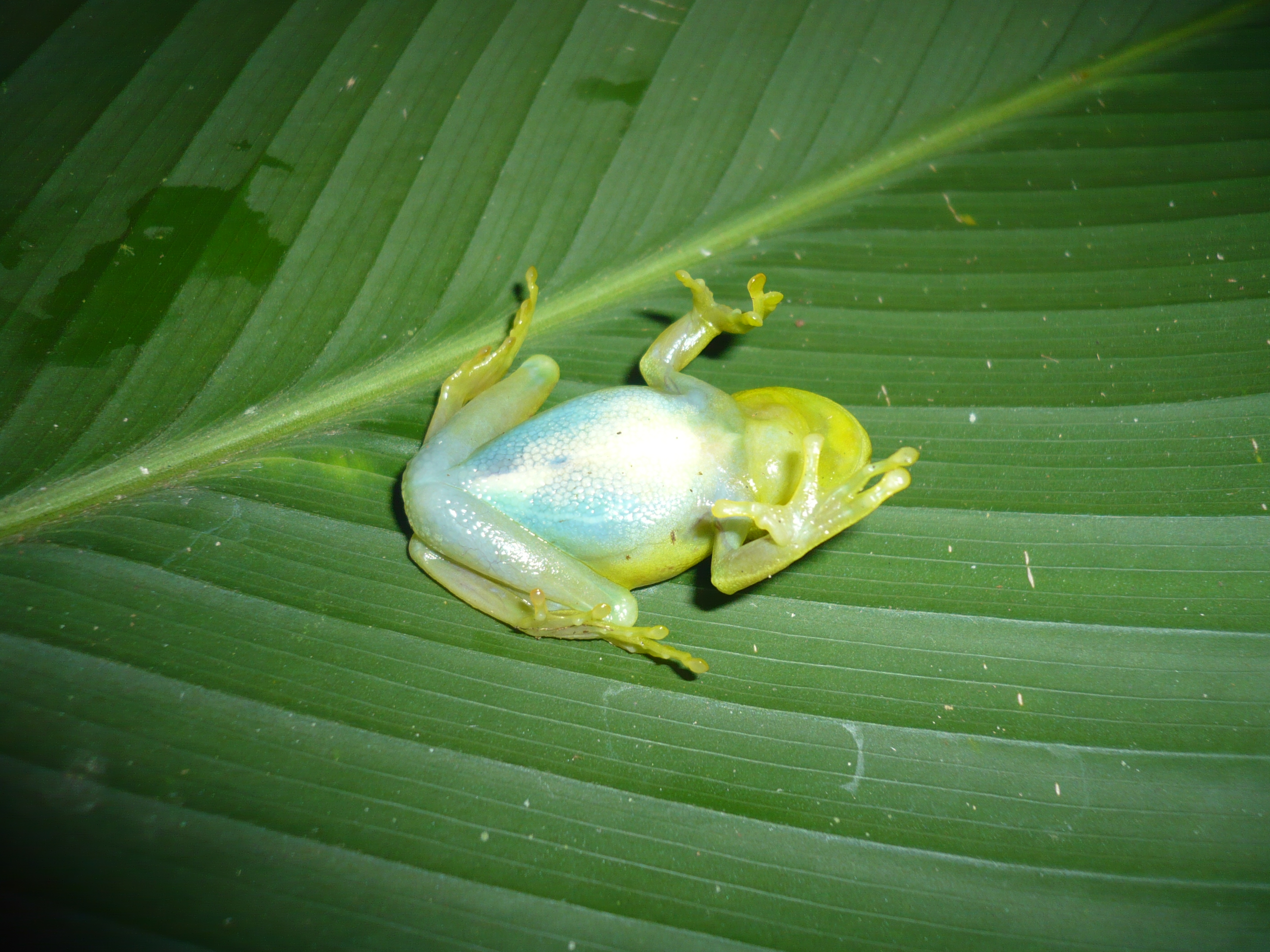
