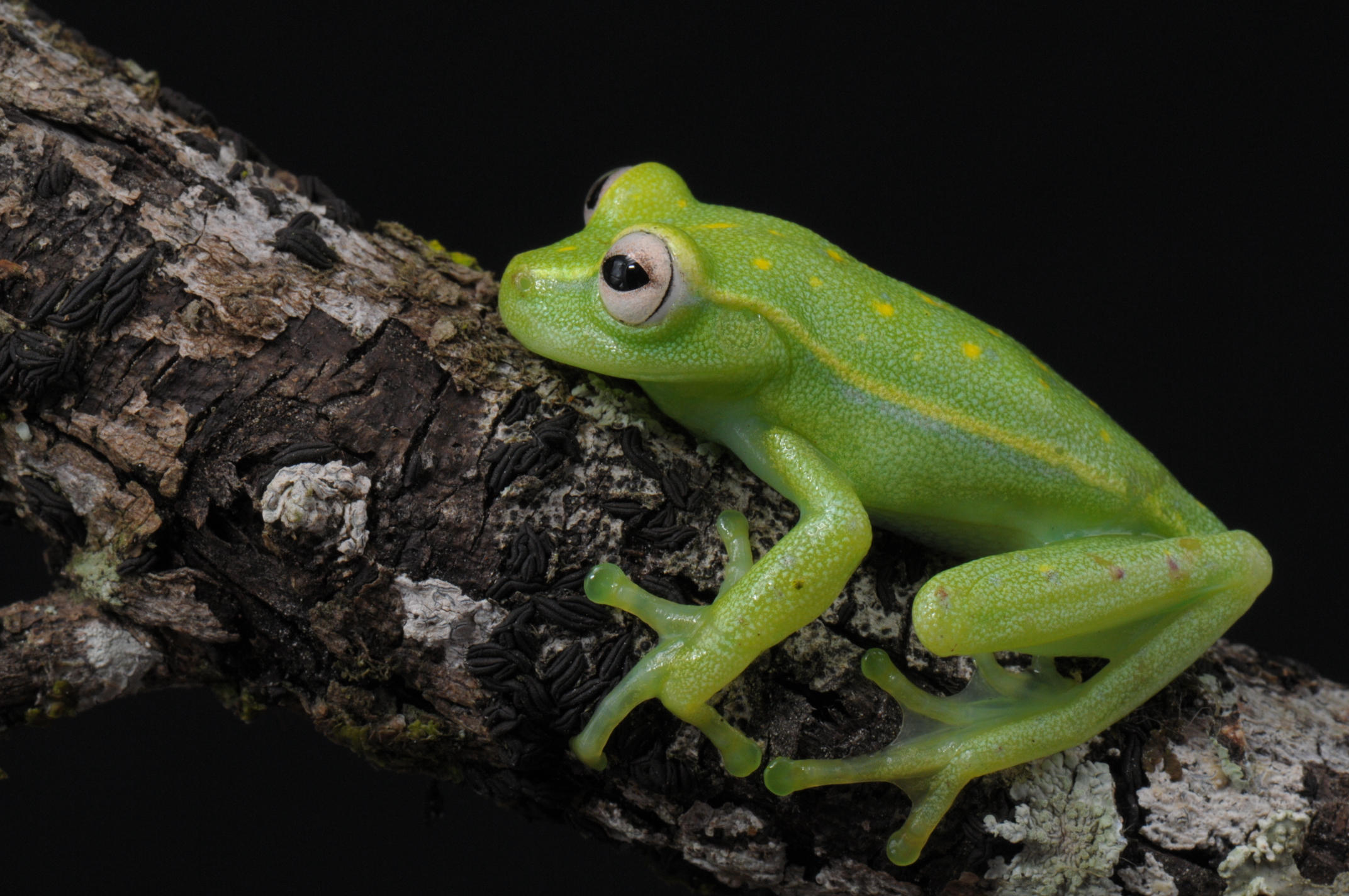

Conservation status
- Least Concern (IUCN 3.1)

Scientific classification
- Kingdom: Animalia
- Phylum: Chordata
- Class: Amphibia
- Order: Anura
- Family: Hylidae
- Genus: Boana
- Species: B. atlantica

Binomial name
- Boana atlantica (Caramaschi & Velosa, 1996)

Synonyms
- Hyla atlantica Caramaschi and Velosa, 1996; Hypsiboas atlanticus (Caramaschi & Velosa, 1996)

= Boana atlantica =

Species of amphibian

Boana atlantica is a small-sized species of tree frog in the family Hylidae. It is endemic to the Atlantic Forest from Pernambuco to Bahia in northeastern Brazil. It is a very abundant species inhabiting primary and secondary forest and forest edge, including degraded forest. It breeds in fish ponds, lakes and pools. It is an adaptable species but it can be locally threatened by habitat loss.

In 2017, it became the second amphibian species confirmed to be fluorescent (under UV-light), only a few months after it had been discovered in the closely related polka-dot tree frog (B. punctata).
