= Intra-species recognition =

Recognition of another member of the same species

Intra-species recognition is the recognition by a member of an animal species of a conspecific (another member of the same species). In many species, such recognition is necessary for procreation.

Different species may employ different methods, but all of them are based on one or more senses. The recognition may happen by the chemical signature (smell), by having a distinctive shape or color (sight), by emitting certain sounds (hearing), or even by behaviour patterns. Often a combination of these is used.

Among human beings, the sense of sight is usually in charge of recognizing other members of the same species, with maybe the subconscious help of smell. In particular, the human brain has a disproportionate amount of processing power dedicated to finely analyze the features of a human face. This is why most humans are able to distinguish human beings from one other (barring look-alikes), and a human being from a similar species like some anthropomorphic ape, with only a quick glance.

Some intra-species recognition is learned, for example in waterfowl, known as imprinting.

Intra-species recognition has been hypothesised as an explanation for the bizarre and varied structures found in dinosaurs, as it drives rapid evolution without a specific direction. However, this has raised criticism and the prevalence of species recognition in dinosaur evolution is doubted by many, not least because it is a vague concept.

Intra-species recognition systems are often subtle. For example, the chiffchaff and the willow warbler appear similar by eye, but their call distinguishes them greatly. Sometimes, intra-species recognition is fallible: in many species of frog, males commonly misdirect their amplexus (mounting) to other species or even inanimate objects.

Heliconius charithonia displays intra-species recognition by roosting with conspecifics. They do this with the help of UV rhodopsins in the eye that help them distinguish between ultraviolet yellow pigments and regular yellow pigments. They have also been known to emit chemical cues to recognize members of their own species.

== See also ==
- Assortative mating
- Sexual selection
