= Hartree (disambiguation) =

Hartree is the unit of energy in the system of atomic units.

Hartree may also refer to:

- Appleton–Hartree equation, a mathematical expression that describes the refractive index for electromagnetic wave propagation in a cold magnetized plasma, named in part after Douglas Hartee
- Cape Hartree, a cape in the South Orkney Islands
- Hartree Centre, a computing research facility, named after Douglas Hartree
- Hartree equation, an equation for atoms, named after Douglas Hartree
- Hartree–Fock method, a method of approximation for the determination of the wave function and the energy of a quantum many-body system in a stationary state, named in part after Douglas Hartree
- Post-Hartree–Fock, the set of methods developed to improve on the Hartree–Fock method
- Restricted open-shell Hartree–Fock, a variant of Hartree–Fock method for open shell molecules
- Unrestricted Hartree–Fock, the most common molecular orbital method for open shell molecules

Hartree is a surname and may also refer to:

- John Dickson, Lord Hartree (1600–1653), Scottish judge and politician
- Douglas Hartree (1897–1958), English mathematician and physicist, son of Eva Hartree
- Eva Hartree (1873–1947), first woman to be Mayor of Cambridge, mother of Douglas Hartree
- George Hartree (1914–1988), English actor and musician known professionally as Charles Hawtrey (actor, born 1914)
- John Hartree (born 1948), Australian rules footballer
