= Koopmans' theorem =

Theorem in quantum mechanics

Koopmans' theorem states that in closed-shell Hartree–Fock theory (HF), the first ionization energy of a molecular system is equal to the negative of the orbital energy of the highest occupied molecular orbital (HOMO). This theorem is named after Tjalling Koopmans, who published this result in 1934 for atoms.

Koopmans' theorem is exact in the context of restricted Hartree–Fock theory if it is assumed that the orbitals of the ion are identical to those of the neutral molecule (the frozen orbital approximation). Ionization energies calculated this way are in qualitative agreement with experiment – the first ionization energy of small molecules is often calculated with an error of less than two electron volts. Therefore, the validity of Koopmans' theorem is intimately tied to the accuracy of the underlying Hartree–Fock wavefunction. The two main sources of error are orbital relaxation, which refers to the changes in the Fock operator and Hartree–Fock orbitals when changing the number of electrons in the system, and electron correlation, referring to the validity of representing the entire many-body wavefunction using the Hartree–Fock wavefunction, i.e. a single Slater determinant composed of orbitals that are the eigenfunctions of the corresponding self-consistent Fock operator.

Empirical comparisons with experimental values and higher-quality ab initio calculations suggest that in many cases, but not all, the energetic corrections due to relaxation effects nearly cancel the corrections due to electron correlation.

A similar theorem (Janak's theorem) exists in density functional theory (DFT) for relating the exact first vertical ionization energy and electron affinity to the HOMO and LUMO energies, although both the derivation and the precise statement differ from that of Koopmans' theorem. Ionization energies calculated from DFT orbital energies are usually poorer than those of Koopmans' theorem, with errors much larger than two electron volts possible depending on the exchange-correlation approximation employed. The LUMO energy shows little correlation with the electron affinity with typical approximations. The error in the DFT counterpart of Koopmans' theorem is a result of the approximation employed for the exchange correlation energy functional so that, unlike in HF theory, there is the possibility of improved results with the development of better approximations.

== Generalizations ==
While Koopmans' theorem was originally stated for calculating ionization energies from restricted (closed-shell) Hartree–Fock wavefunctions, the term has since taken on a more generalized meaning as a way of using orbital energies to calculate energy changes due to changes in the number of electrons in a system.

=== Ground-state and excited-state ions ===
Koopmans' theorem applies to the removal of an electron from any occupied molecular orbital to form a positive ion. Removal of the electron from different occupied molecular orbitals leads to the ion in different electronic states. The lowest of these states is the ground state and this often, but not always, arises from removal of the electron from the HOMO. The other states are excited electronic states.

For example, the electronic configuration of the H_{2}O molecule is (1a_{1})^{2} (2a_{1})^{2} (1b_{2})^{2} (3a_{1})^{2} (1b_{1})^{2}, where the symbols a_{1}, b_{2} and b_{1} are orbital labels based on molecular symmetry. From Koopmans' theorem the energy of the 1b_{1} HOMO corresponds to the ionization energy to form the H_{2}O^{+} ion in its ground state (1a_{1})^{2} (2a_{1})^{2} (1b_{2})^{2} (3a_{1})^{2} (1b_{1})^{1}. The energy of the second-highest MO 3a_{1} refers to the ion in the excited state (1a_{1})^{2} (2a_{1})^{2} (1b_{2})^{2} (3a_{1})^{1} (1b_{1})^{2}, and so on. In this case the order of the ion electronic states corresponds to the order of the orbital energies. Excited-state ionization energies can be measured by photoelectron spectroscopy.

For H_{2}O, the near-Hartree–Fock orbital energies (with sign changed) of these orbitals are 1a_{1} 559.5, 2a_{1} 36.7 1b_{2} 19.5, 3a_{1} 15.9 and 1b_{1} 13.8 eV. The corresponding ionization energies are 539.7, 32.2, 18.5, 14.7 and 12.6 eV. As explained above, the deviations are due to the effects of orbital relaxation as well as differences in electron correlation energy between the molecular and the various ionized states.

For N_{2} in contrast, the order of orbital energies is not identical to the order of ionization energies. Near-Hartree–Fock calculations with a large basis set indicate that the 1π_{u} bonding orbital is the HOMO. However the lowest ionization energy corresponds to removal of an electron from the 3σ_{g} bonding orbital. In this case the deviation is attributed primarily to the difference in correlation energy between the two orbitals.

=== For electron affinities ===
It is sometimes claimed that Koopmans' theorem also allows the calculation of electron affinities as the energy of the lowest unoccupied molecular orbitals (LUMO) of the respective systems. However, Koopmans' original paper makes no claim with regard to the significance of eigenvalues of the Fock operator other than that corresponding to the HOMO. Nevertheless, it is straightforward to generalize the original statement of Koopmans' to calculate the electron affinity in this sense.

Calculations of electron affinities using this statement of Koopmans' theorem have been criticized on the grounds that virtual (unoccupied) orbitals do not have well-founded physical interpretations, and that their orbital energies are very sensitive to the choice of basis set used in the calculation. As the basis set becomes more complete; more and more "molecular" orbitals that are not really on the molecule of interest will appear, and care must be taken not to use these orbitals for estimating electron affinities.

Comparisons with experiment and higher-quality calculations show that electron affinities predicted in this manner are generally quite poor.

=== For open-shell systems ===
Koopmans' theorem is also applicable to open-shell systems, however, orbital energies (eigenvalues of Roothaan equations) should be corrected, as was shown in the 1970s. Despite this early work, application of Koopmans theorem to open-shell systems continued to cause confusion, e.g., it was stated that Koopmans theorem can only be applied for removing the unpaired electron. Later, the validity of Koopmans' theorem for ROHF was revisited and several procedures for obtaining meaningful orbital energies were reported. The spin up (alpha) and spin down (beta) orbital energies do not necessarily have to be the same.

== Counterpart in density functional theory ==
Kohn–Sham (KS) density functional theory (KS-DFT) admits its own version of Koopmans' theorem (sometimes called the DFT-Koopmans' theorem) very similar in spirit to that of Hartree-Fock theory. The theorem equates the first (vertical) ionization energy $I$ of a system of $N$ electrons to the negative of the corresponding KS HOMO energy $\epsilon_H$. More generally, this relation is true even when the KS system describes a zero-temperature ensemble with non-integer number of electrons $N - \delta N$ for integer $N$ and $\delta N \to 0$. When considering $N + \delta N$ electrons the infinitesimal excess charge enters the KS LUMO of the N electron system but then the exact KS potential jumps by a constant known as the "derivative discontinuity". It can be argued that the vertical electron affinity is equal exactly to the negative of the sum of the LUMO energy and the derivative discontinuity.

Unlike the approximate status of Koopmans' theorem in Hartree Fock theory (because of the neglect of orbital relaxation), in the exact KS mapping the theorem is exact, including the effect of orbital relaxation. A sketchy proof of this exact relation goes in three stages. First, for any finite system $I$ determines the $|\mathbf{r}| \to \infty$ asymptotic form of the density, which decays as $n(\mathbf{r}) \to \exp \left (-2\sqrt{\frac{2 m_{\rm e}}{\hbar} I}|\mathbf{r}| \right )$. Next, as a corollary (since the physically interacting system has the same density as the KS system), both must have the same ionization energy. Finally, since the KS potential is zero at infinity, the ionization energy of the KS system is, by definition, the negative of its HOMO energy, i.e., $\epsilon_H = -I$.

While these are exact statements in the formalism of DFT, the use of approximate exchange-correlation potentials makes the calculated energies approximate and often the orbital energies are very different from the corresponding ionization energies (even by several eV!).

A tuning procedure is able to "impose" Koopmans' theorem on DFT approximations, thereby improving many of its related predictions in actual applications. In approximate DFTs one can estimate to high degree of accuracy the deviance from Koopmans' theorem using the concept of energy curvature. It provides excitation energies to zeroth-order and $\frac{\partial E}{\partial n_i} = \varepsilon_i$.

== Orbital picture within many-body formalisms ==
The concept of molecular orbitals and a Koopmans-like picture of ionization or electron attachment processes can be extended to correlated many-body wavefunctions by introducing Dyson orbitals. Dyson orbitals are defined as the generalized overlap between an $N$-electron molecular wavefunction and the $N-1$ electron wave function of the ionized system (or $N+1$ electron wave function of an electron-attached system):

$$\phi^d(1) = \sqrt N \int \Psi^N_I(1,\dots ,n) \Psi^{N-1}_F(2,\dots ,n)\,d2\dots dn \;.$$

Hartree-Fock canonical orbitals are Dyson orbitals computed for the Hartree-Fock wavefunction of the $N$-electron system and Koopmans approximation of the $N\pm1$ electron system. When correlated wavefunctions are used, Dyson orbitals include correlation and orbital relaxation effects. Dyson orbitals contain all information about the initial and final states of the system needed to compute experimentally observable quantities, such as total and differential photoionization/phtodetachment cross sections.
