= Unrestricted Hartree–Fock =

Method for calculating open-shell systems

Unrestricted Hartree–Fock (UHF) theory is the most common molecular orbital method for open shell molecules where the number of electrons of each spin are not equal. While restricted Hartree–Fock theory uses a single molecular orbital twice, one multiplied by the α spin function and the other multiplied by the β spin function in the Slater determinant, unrestricted Hartree–Fock theory uses different molecular orbitals for the α and β electrons. This has been called a different orbitals for different spins (DODS) method. The result is a pair of coupled Roothaan equations, known as the Pople–Nesbet–Berthier equations.

$$\mathbf{F}^\alpha\ \mathbf{C}^\alpha\ = \mathbf{S} \mathbf{C}^\alpha\ \mathbf{\epsilon}^\alpha\$$

$$\mathbf{F}^\beta\ \mathbf{C}^\beta\ = \mathbf{S} \mathbf{C}^\beta\ \mathbf{\epsilon}^\beta\$$

Where $\mathbf{F}^\alpha\$ and $\mathbf{F}^\beta\$ are the Fock matrices for the $\alpha\$ and $\beta\$ orbitals, $\mathbf{C}^\alpha\$ and $\mathbf{C}^\beta\$ are the matrices of coefficients for the $\alpha\$ and $\beta\$ orbitals, $\mathbf{S}$ is the overlap matrix of the basis functions, and $\mathbf{\epsilon}^\alpha\$ and $\mathbf{\epsilon}^\beta\$ are the (diagonal, by convention) matrices of orbital energies for the $\alpha\$ and $\beta\$ orbitals. The pair of equations are coupled because the Fock matrix elements of one spin contains coefficients of both spin as the orbital has to be optimized in the average field of all other electrons. The final result is a set of molecular orbitals and orbital energies for the α spin electrons and a set of molecular orbitals and orbital energies for the β electrons.

This method has one drawback. A single Slater determinant of different orbitals for different spins is not a satisfactory eigenfunction of the total spin operator - $\mathbf{S}^2$. The ground state is contaminated by excited states. If there is one more electron of α spin than β spin, the ground state is a doublet. The average value of $\mathbf{S}^2$, written $\langle \mathbf{S}^2 \rangle$, should be $\tfrac{1}{2}(\tfrac{1}{2} + 1) = 0.75$ but will actually be rather more than this value as the doublet state is contaminated by a quadruplet state. A triplet state with two excess α electrons should have $\langle \mathbf{S}^2 \rangle$ = 1 (1 + 1) = 2, but it will be larger as the triplet is contaminated by a quintuplet state. When carrying out unrestricted Hartree–Fock calculations, it is always necessary to check this contamination. For example, with a doublet state, if $\langle \mathbf{S}^2 \rangle$ = 0.8 or less, it is probably satisfactory. If it is 1.0 or so, it is certainly not satisfactory and the calculation should be rejected and a different approach taken. It requires experience to make this judgment. Even singlet states can suffer from spin-contamination, for example the H_{2} dissociation curve is discontinuous at the point when spin-contamination states (known as the Coulson–Fischer point).

Despite this drawback, the unrestricted Hartree–Fock method is used frequently, and in preference to the restricted open-shell Hartree–Fock (ROHF) method, because UHF is simpler to code, easier to develop post-Hartree–Fock methods with, and returns unique functions unlike ROHF where different Fock operators can give the same final total wave function, but different orbitals.

Unrestricted Hartree–Fock theory was discovered by Gaston Berthier and subsequently developed by John Pople; it is found in almost all ab initio programs.
