= Restricted open-shell Hartree–Fock =

Restricted open-shell Hartree–Fock (ROHF) is a variant of Hartree–Fock method for open shell molecules. It uses doubly occupied molecular orbitals as far as possible and then singly occupied orbitals for the unpaired electrons. This is the simple picture for open shell molecules but it is difficult to implement. The foundations of the ROHF method were first formulated by Clemens C. J. Roothaan in a celebrated paper and then extended by various authors, see e.g. for in-depth discussions.

As with restricted Hartree–Fock theory for closed shell molecules, it leads to Roothaan equations written in the form of a generalized eigenvalue problem

$$\mathbf{F} \mathbf{C} = \mathbf{S} \mathbf{C} \mathbf{\epsilon}$$

where $\mathbf{F}$ is the so-called Fock matrix (which is a function of $\mathbf{C}$), $\mathbf{C}$ is a matrix of coefficients, $\mathbf{S}$ is the overlap matrix of the basis functions, and $\epsilon$ is the (diagonal, by convention) matrix of orbital energies. Unlike restricted Hartree–Fock theory for closed shell molecules, the form of the Fock matrix is not unique. Different so-called canonicalisations can be used leading to different orbitals and different orbital energies, but the same total wave function, total energy, and other observables.

In contrast to unrestricted Hartree–Fock (UHF), the ROHF wave function is a satisfactory eigenfunction of the total spin operator, $\mathbf{S}^2$ (i.e. no spin contamination is observed).

Developing post-Hartree–Fock (post-HF) methods based on a ROHF wave function is inherently more difficult than using a UHF wave function, due to the lack of a unique set of molecular orbitals. However, different choices of reference orbitals have shown to provide similar results, and thus many different post-HFk methods have been implemented in a variety of electronic structure packages. Many (but not all) of these post-HF methods are completely invariant with respect to orbital choice (assuming that no orbitals are "frozen" and thus not correlated). The ZAPT2 version of Møller–Plesset perturbation theory specifies the choice of orbitals.
