= Tjalling Koopmans =

American mathematician (1910–1985)

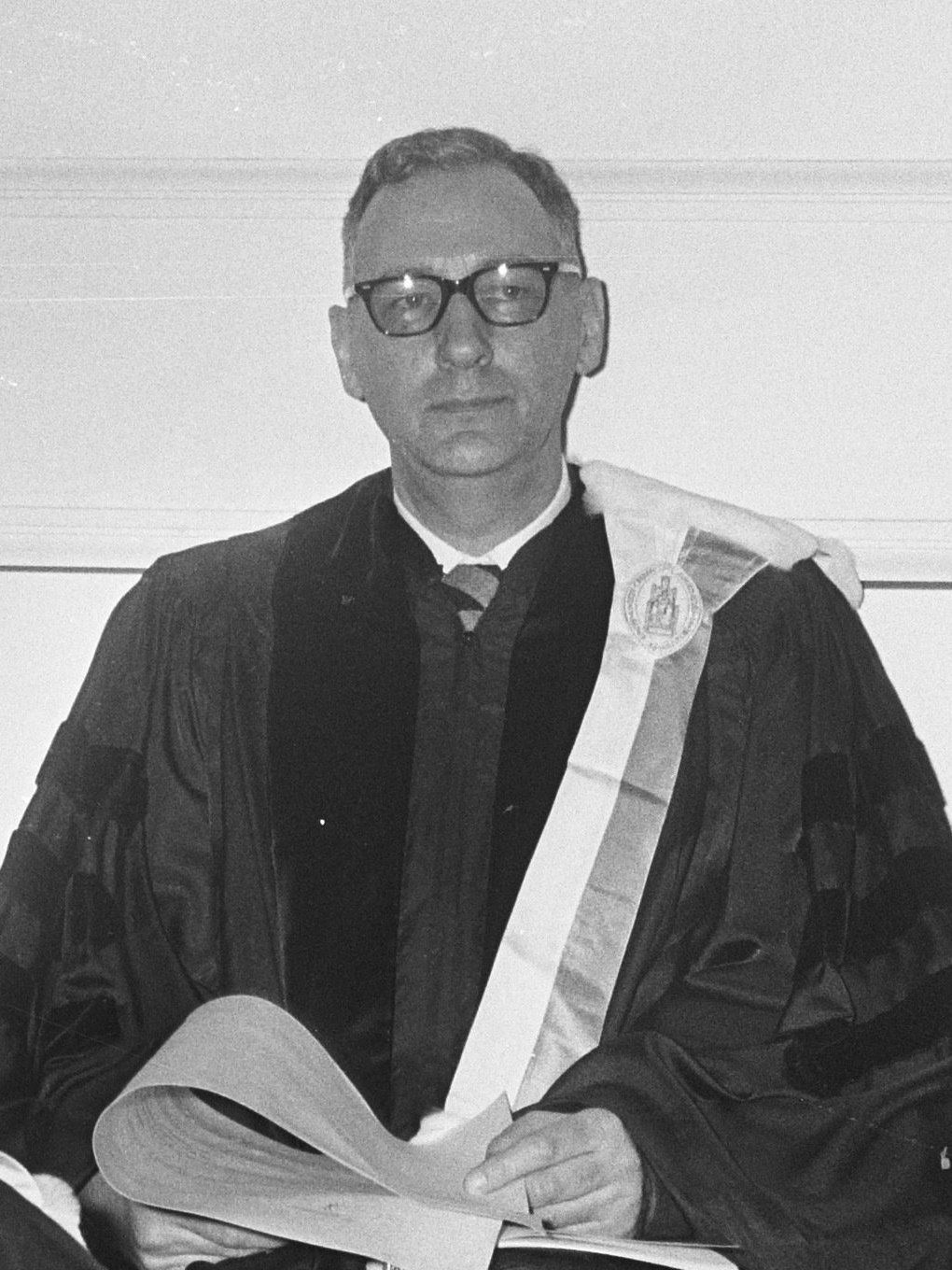
- Koopmans in 1967
- Born: August 28, 1910 's-Graveland, Netherlands
- Died: February 26, 1985 (aged 74); New Haven, Connecticut, US
- Education: University of Utrecht; University of Leiden
- Known for: Transport economics Hitchcock–Koopmans transportation problem Ramsey–Cass–Koopmans model Koopmans' theorem
- Awards: Nobel Memorial Prize in Economic Sciences (1975)
- Scientific career
- Fields: Economics, Physics
- Workplaces: University of Chicago
- Doctoral advisor: Hans Kramers; Jan Tinbergen
- Doctoral students: Carl Christ; Stanley Reiter; Rolf Mantel; Guillermo Calvo

Tjalling Charles Koopmans (August 28, 1910 – February 26, 1985) was a Dutch-American mathematician and economist. He was the joint winner with Leonid Kantorovich of the 1975 Nobel Memorial Prize in Economic Sciences for his work on the theory of the optimum allocation of resources. Koopmans showed that on the basis of certain efficiency criteria, it is possible to make important deductions concerning optimum price systems.

== Biography ==
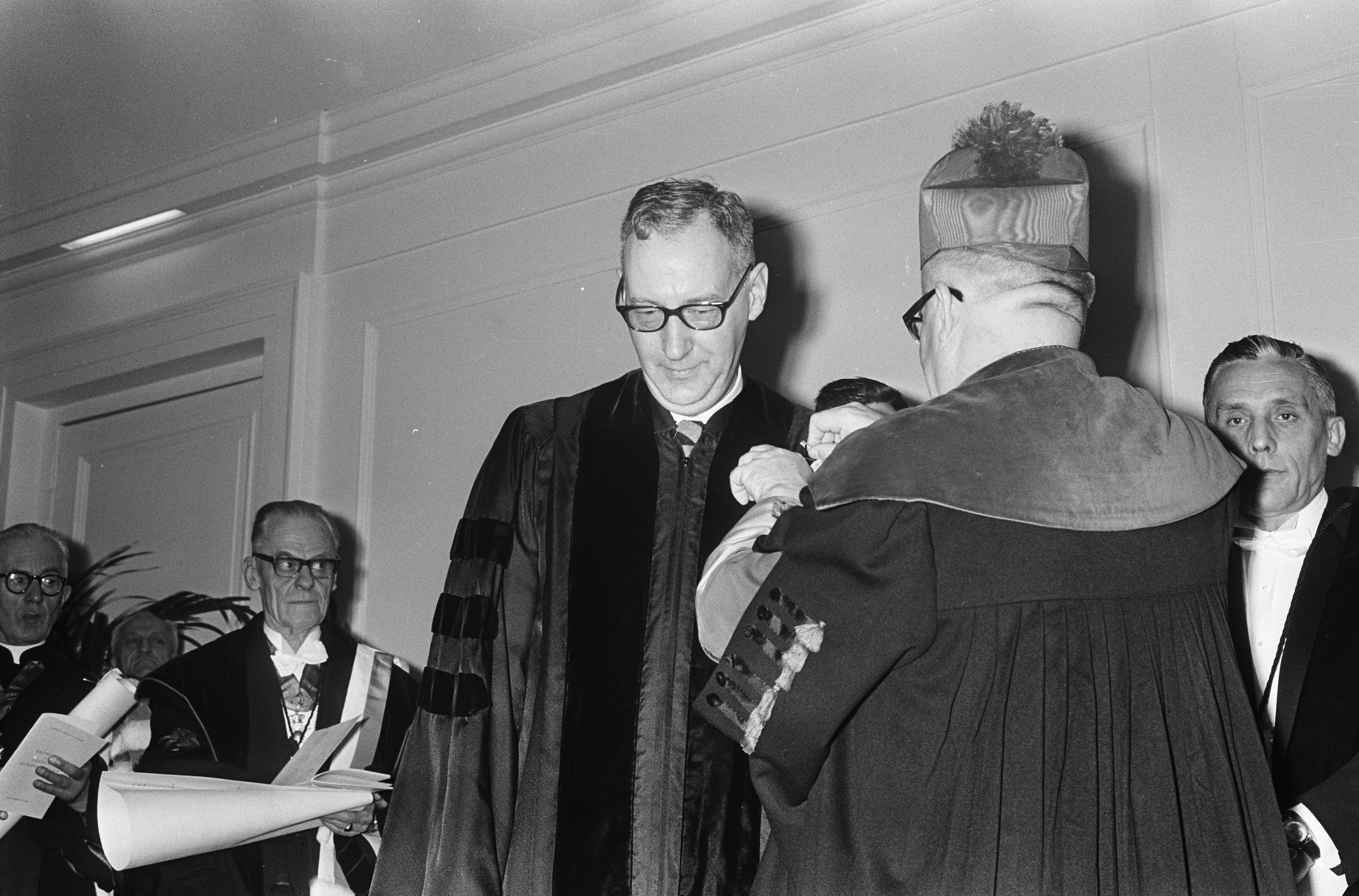
Koopmans (1967)

Koopmans was born in 's-Graveland, Netherlands. He began his university education at the Utrecht University at seventeen, specializing in mathematics. Three years later, in 1930, he switched to theoretical physics. In 1933, he met Jan Tinbergen, the winner of the 1969 Nobel Memorial Prize in Economics and moved to Amsterdam to study mathematical economics under him. In addition to mathematical economics, Koopmans extended his explorations to econometrics and statistics. In 1936, he graduated from Leiden University with a PhD, under the direction of Hendrik Kramers. The title of the thesis was "Linear regression analysis of economic time series". He also worked for the Economic and Financial Organization of the League of Nations.

Koopmans moved to the United States in 1940. There, he worked for a while for a government body in Washington, D.C., where he published on the economics of transportation focusing on optimal routing, then moved to Chicago where he joined a research body, the Cowles Commission for Research in Economics, affiliated with the University of Chicago. In 1946, he became a naturalized citizen of the United States, and in 1948, director of the Cowles Commission. Also in 1948, he was elected as a Fellow of the American Statistical Association. In 1950, he became a corresponding member of the Royal Netherlands Academy of Arts and Sciences. Rising hostile opposition to the Cowles Commission by the department of economics at University of Chicago during the 1950s led Koopmans to convince the Cowles family to move it to Yale University in 1955 (where it was renamed the Cowles Foundation). He continued to publish, on the economics of optimal growth and activity analysis.

Koopmans's early works on the Hartree-Fock theory of atomic and molecular structure are associated with the Koopmans' theorem, which is very well known in quantum chemistry.

Koopmans was awarded his Nobel memorial prize (jointly with Leonid Kantorovich) for his contributions to the field of resource allocation, specifically the theory of optimal use of resources. The work for which the prize was awarded focused on activity analysis, the study of interactions between the inputs and outputs of production, and their relationship to economic efficiency and prices. Finally, the importance of the article by Koopmans (1942) deriving the distribution of the serial correlation coefficient was recognized by John von Neumann, and it later influenced the optimal tests for a unit root by John Denis Sargan and Alok Bhargava (Sargan and Bhargava, 1983).

=== Family and name ===
Tjalling Charles Koopmans was a son of Sjoerd Koopmans and Wytske van der Zee; his middle name Charles was probably derived from his patronymic "Sjoerds".

One of Sjoerd Koopmans's sisters, Gatske Koopmans, and her husband Symon van der Meer were the paternal grandparents of Nobel Prize winner Simon van der Meer. Tjalling Koopmans and Simon van der Meer were therefore first cousins once removed.

Tjalling had two brothers, one of whom was theologian Rev. Dr Jan Koopmans, who in 1940, early during the German occupation of the Netherlands, wrote the widely distributed pamphlet "Bijna te laat" ("Almost too late", 30,000 copies), warning about the future of the Jews under the Nazi regime. In 1945, towards the end of the war, he witnessed an execution of hostages in Amsterdam from behind a window and was mortally wounded by a stray bullet.

Koopmans married Truus Wanningen in October 1936. The couple had three children – a son, Henry, and two daughters, Anne and Helen.

== Selected works ==
- Koopmans, Tjalling C. (March 1942). "Serial correlation and quadratic forms in normal variables". Annals of Mathematical Statistics. 13 (1). Institute of Mathematical Statistics: 14–33. doi:10.1214/aoms/1177731639. JSTOR 2236158.
- Koopmans, Tjalling C.; Montias, J.M. (1971). On the Description and Comparison of Economic Systems (Cowles Foundation Paper 357).
- Koopmans, Tjalling C. (December 11, 1975). Nobel Memorial Lecture: Concepts of optimality and their uses (PDF).
- Koopmans, Tjalling C.; Debreu, Gérard (December 1982). "Additively decomposed quasiconvex functions" (PDF). Mathematical Programming. 24 (1). Springer: 1–38. doi:10.1007/BF01585092. S2CID 206799604.

== See also ==
- Linear programming
- Transportation theory (mathematics)
- Koopmans' Theorem (in quantum chemistry)

Awards
Preceded by Gunnar Myrdal; Friedrich August von Hayek	Laureate of the Nobel Memorial Prize in Economics; 1975; Served alongside: Leonid Vitaliyevich Kantorovich	Succeeded by Milton Friedman
