= Antisymmetrizer =

Operator in quantum mechanics

In quantum mechanics, an antisymmetrizer $\mathcal{A}$ (also known as an antisymmetrizing operator) is a linear operator that makes a wave function of N identical fermions antisymmetric under the exchange of the coordinates of any pair of fermions. After application of $\mathcal{A}$ the wave function satisfies the Pauli exclusion principle. Since $\mathcal{A}$ is a projection operator, application of the antisymmetrizer to a wave function that is already totally antisymmetric has no effect, acting as the identity operator.

== Mathematical definition ==
Consider a wave function depending on the space and spin coordinates of N fermions:

$$\Psi(1,2, \ldots, N)\quad\text{with} \quad i \leftrightarrow (\mathbf{r}_i, \sigma_i),$$

where the position vector r_{i} of particle i is a vector in $\mathbb{R}^3$ and σ_{i} takes on 2s+1 values, where s is the half-integer, intrinsic spin of the fermion. For electrons s = 1/2 and σ can have two values ("spin-up": 1/2 and "spin-down": −1/2). It is assumed that the positions of the coordinates in the notation for Ψ have a well-defined meaning. For instance, the 2-fermion function Ψ(1,2) will in general be not the same as Ψ(2,1). This implies that in general $\Psi(1,2)- \Psi(2,1) \ne 0$ and therefore we can define meaningfully a transposition operator $\hat{P}_{ij}$ that interchanges the coordinates of particle i and j. In general this operator will not be equal to the identity operator (although in special cases it may be).

A transposition has the parity (also known as signature) −1. The Pauli principle postulates that a wave function of identical fermions must be an eigenfunction of a transposition operator with its parity as eigenvalue

$$\begin{align}
\hat{P}_{ij} \Psi\big(1,2,\ldots,i, \ldots,j,\ldots, N\big)& \equiv \Psi\big(\pi(1),\pi(2),\ldots,\pi(i), \ldots,\pi(j),\ldots, \pi(N)\big)  \\
&\equiv \Psi(1,2,\ldots,j, \ldots,i,\ldots, N) \\
&=  - \Psi(1,2,\ldots,i, \ldots,j,\ldots, N).
\end{align}$$

Here we associated the transposition operator $\hat{P}_{ij}$ with the permutation of coordinates π that acts on the set of N coordinates. In this case π = (ij), where (ij) is the cycle notation for the transposition of the coordinates of particle i and j.

Transpositions may be composed (applied in sequence). This defines a product between the transpositions that is associative. It can be shown that an arbitrary permutation of N objects can be written as a product of transpositions and that the number of transposition in this decomposition is of fixed parity. That is, either a permutation is always decomposed in an even number of transpositions (the permutation is called even and has the parity +1), or a permutation is always decomposed in an odd number of transpositions and then it is an odd permutation with parity −1. Denoting the parity of an arbitrary permutation π by (−1)^{π}, it follows that an antisymmetric wave function satisfies

$$\hat{P} \Psi\big(1,2,\ldots, N\big) \equiv \Psi\big(\pi(1),\pi(2),\ldots, \pi(N)\big)  =  (-1)^\pi \Psi(1,2,\ldots, N),$$

where we associated the linear operator $\hat{P}$ with the permutation π.

The set of all N! permutations with the associative product: "apply one permutation after the other", is a group, known as the permutation group or symmetric group, denoted by S_{N}. We define the antisymmetrizer as

$$\mathcal{A} \equiv \frac{1}{N!} \sum_{P \in S_N} (-1)^\pi \hat{P} .$$

== Properties of the antisymmetrizer ==
In the representation theory of finite groups the antisymmetrizer is a well-known object, because the set of parities $\{ (-1)^\pi \}$ forms a one-dimensional (and hence irreducible) representation of the permutation group known as the antisymmetric representation. The representation being one-dimensional, the set of parities form the character of the antisymmetric representation. The antisymmetrizer is in fact a character projection operator and is quasi-idempotent,

This has the consequence that for any N-particle wave function Ψ(1, ...,N) we have

$$\mathcal{A}\Psi(1,\ldots, N)  = \begin{cases}
&0 \\
&\Psi'(1,\dots, N)  \ne 0.
\end{cases}$$

Either Ψ does not have an antisymmetric component, and then the antisymmetrizer projects onto zero, or it has one and then the antisymmetrizer projects out this antisymmetric component Ψ'. The antisymmetrizer carries a left and a right representation of the group:

$$\hat{P} \mathcal{A} = \mathcal{A} \hat{P} = (-1)^\pi \mathcal{A},\qquad \forall \pi \in S_N,$$

with the operator $\hat{P}$ representing the coordinate permutation π. Now it holds, for any N-particle wave function Ψ(1, ...,N) with a non-vanishing antisymmetric component, that

$$\hat{P} \mathcal{A}\Psi(1,\ldots, N) \equiv \hat{P} \Psi'(1,\ldots, N)=(-1)^\pi \Psi'(1,\ldots, N),$$

showing that the non-vanishing component is indeed antisymmetric.

If a wave function is symmetric under any odd parity permutation it has no antisymmetric component. Indeed, assume that the permutation π, represented by the operator $\hat{P}$, has odd parity and that Ψ is symmetric, then

$$\hat{P} \Psi = \Psi \Longrightarrow \mathcal{A} \hat{P} \Psi = \mathcal{A}\Psi \Longrightarrow -\mathcal{A}  \Psi = \mathcal{A}\Psi \Longrightarrow \mathcal{A} \Psi = 0.$$

As an example of an application of this result, we assume that Ψ is a spin-orbital product. Assume further that a spin-orbital occurs twice (is "doubly occupied") in this product, once with coordinate k and once with coordinate q. Then the product is symmetric under the transposition (k, q) and hence vanishes. Notice that this result gives the original formulation of the Pauli principle: no two electrons can have the same set of quantum numbers (be in the same spin-orbital).

Permutations of identical particles are unitary, (the Hermitian adjoint is equal to the inverse of the operator), and since π and π^{−1} have the same parity, it follows that the antisymmetrizer is Hermitian,

$$\mathcal{A}^\dagger = \mathcal{A}.$$

The antisymmetrizer commutes with any observable $\hat{H}\,$ (Hermitian operator corresponding to a physical—observable—quantity)

$$[\mathcal{A}, \hat{H}] = 0.$$

If it were otherwise, measurement of $\hat{H}\,$ could distinguish the particles, in contradiction with the assumption that only the coordinates of indistinguishable particles are affected by the antisymmetrizer.

== Connection with Slater determinant ==
In the special case that the wave function to be antisymmetrized is a product of spin-orbitals

$$\Psi(1,2, \ldots, N) = \psi_{n_1}(1)  \psi_{n_2}(2) \cdots \psi_{n_N}(N)$$

the Slater determinant is created by the antisymmetrizer operating on the product of spin-orbitals, as below:

$$\sqrt{N!}\ \mathcal{A} \Psi(1,2, \ldots, N) =
\frac{1}{\sqrt{N!}}
\begin{vmatrix}
\psi_{n_1}(1) & \psi_{n_1}(2) & \cdots & \psi_{n_1}(N) \\
\psi_{n_2}(1) & \psi_{n_2}(2) & \cdots & \psi_{n_2}(N) \\
\vdots & \vdots &  & \vdots \\
\psi_{n_N}(1) & \psi_{n_N}(2) & \cdots & \psi_{n_N}(N) \\
\end{vmatrix}$$

The correspondence follows immediately from the Leibniz formula for determinants, which reads

$$\det(\mathbf{B}) =
\sum_{\pi \in S_N} (-1)^\pi   B_{1,\pi(1)}\cdot B_{2,\pi(2)}\cdot B_{3,\pi(3)}\cdot\,\cdots\,\cdot B_{N,\pi(N)},$$

where B is the matrix

$$\mathbf{B} =
\begin{pmatrix}
B_{1,1} & B_{1,2} & \cdots & B_{1,N} \\
B_{2,1} & B_{2,2} & \cdots & B_{2,N} \\
\vdots  & \vdots &  & \vdots \\
B_{N,1} & B_{N,2} & \cdots & B_{N,N} \\
\end{pmatrix}.$$

To see the correspondence we notice that the fermion labels, permuted by the terms in the antisymmetrizer, label different columns (are second indices). The first indices are orbital indices, n_{1}, ..., n_{N} labeling the rows.

=== Example ===
By the definition of the antisymmetrizer

$$\begin{align}
\mathcal{A} \psi_a(1)\psi_b(2)\psi_c(3) = &
\frac{1}{6} \Big( \psi_a(1)\psi_b(2)\psi_c(3) + \psi_a(3)\psi_b(1)\psi_c(2) + \psi_a(2)\psi_b(3)\psi_c(1) \\
&{}-\psi_a(2)\psi_b(1)\psi_c(3) - \psi_a(3)\psi_b(2)\psi_c(1)- \psi_a(1)\psi_b(3)\psi_c(2)\Big).
\end{align}$$

Consider the Slater determinant

$$D\equiv
\frac{1}{\sqrt{6}}
\begin{vmatrix}
\psi_a(1) & \psi_a(2) & \psi_a(3) \\
\psi_b(1) & \psi_b(2) & \psi_b(3) \\
\psi_c(1) & \psi_c(2) & \psi_c(3)
\end{vmatrix}.$$

By the Laplace expansion along the first row of D

$$D =
\frac{1}{\sqrt{6}}
\psi_a(1)
\begin{vmatrix}
\psi_b(2) & \psi_b(3) \\
\psi_c(2) & \psi_c(3)
\end{vmatrix}
-\frac{1}{\sqrt{6}}
\psi_a(2)
\begin{vmatrix}
\psi_b(1) & \psi_b(3) \\
\psi_c(1) & \psi_c(3)
\end{vmatrix}
+\frac{1}{\sqrt{6}}
\psi_a(3)
\begin{vmatrix}
\psi_b(1) & \psi_b(2) \\
\psi_c(1) & \psi_c(2)
\end{vmatrix},$$

so that

$$\begin{align}
D=& \frac{1}{\sqrt{6}} \psi_a(1)\Big( \psi_b(2) \psi_c(3) - \psi_b(3) \psi_c(2)\Big)
- \frac{1}{\sqrt{6}} \psi_a(2)\Big( \psi_b(1) \psi_c(3) - \psi_b(3) \psi_c(1)\Big) \\
& {}+ \frac{1}{\sqrt{6}} \psi_a(3)\Big( \psi_b(1) \psi_c(2) - \psi_b(2) \psi_c(1)\Big) .
\end{align}$$

By comparing terms we see that

$$D = \sqrt{6}\ \mathcal{A} \psi_a(1)\psi_b(2)\psi_c(3).$$

== Intermolecular antisymmetrizer ==
One often meets a wave function of the product form $\Psi_A(1,2,\dots,N_A) \Psi_B(N_A+1,N_A+2,\dots,N_A+N_B)$ where the total wave function is not antisymmetric, but the factors are antisymmetric,

$$\mathcal{A}^A \Psi_A(1,2,\dots,N_A) = \Psi_A(1,2,\dots,N_A)$$

and

$$\mathcal{A}^B\Psi_B(N_A+1,N_A+2,\dots,N_A+N_B) = \Psi_B(N_A+1,N_A+2,\dots,N_A+N_B).$$

Here $\mathcal{A}^A$ antisymmetrizes the first N_{A} particles and $\mathcal{A}^B$ antisymmetrizes the second set of N_{B} particles. The operators appearing in these two antisymmetrizers represent the elements of the subgroups S_{N_{A}} and S_{N_{B}}, respectively, of S_{N_{A}+N_{B}}.

Typically, one meets such partially antisymmetric wave functions in the theory of intermolecular forces, where $\Psi_A(1,2,\dots,N_A)$ is the electronic wave function of molecule A and $\Psi_B(N_A+1,N_A+2,\dots,N_A+N_B)$ is the wave function of molecule B. When A and B interact, the Pauli principle requires the antisymmetry of the total wave function, also under intermolecular permutations.

The total system can be antisymmetrized by the total antisymmetrizer $\mathcal{A}^{AB}$ which consists of the (N_{A} + N_{B})! terms in the group S_{N_{A}+N_{B}}. However, in this way one does not take advantage of the partial antisymmetry that is already present. It is more economic to use the fact that the product of the two subgroups is also a subgroup, and to consider the left cosets of this product group in S_{N_{A}+N_{B}}:

$$S_{N_A}\otimes S_{N_B} \subset S_{N_A+N_B} \Longrightarrow \forall \pi \in S_{N_A+N_B}:\quad  \pi = \tau \pi_A \pi_B, \quad
\pi_A\in  S_{N_A}, \;\; \pi_B \in S_{N_B},$$

where τ is a left coset representative. Since

$$(-1)^\pi = (-1)^\tau (-1)^{\pi_A} (-1)^{\pi_B},$$

we can write

$$\mathcal{A}^{AB} = \tilde{\mathcal{A}}^{AB} \mathcal{A}^A \mathcal{A}^B\quad\hbox{with}\quad
\tilde{\mathcal{A}}^{AB} = \sum_{T=1}^{C_{AB}}(-1)^\tau \hat{T}, \quad C_{AB} = \binom{N_A+N_B}{N_A} .$$

The operator $\hat{T}$ represents the coset representative τ (an intermolecular coordinate permutation). Obviously the intermolecular antisymmetrizer $\tilde{\mathcal{A}}^{AB}$ has a factor N_{A}! N_{B}! fewer terms then the total antisymmetrizer. Finally,

$$\begin{align}
\mathcal{A}^{AB}\Psi_A(1,2,\dots,N_A)&\Psi_B(N_A+1,N_A+2,\dots,N_A+N_B)\\
&= \tilde{\mathcal{A}}^{AB}\Psi_A(1,2,\dots,N_A) \Psi_B(N_A+1,N_A+2,\dots,N_A+N_B),
\end{align}$$

so that we see that it suffices to act with $\tilde{\mathcal{A}}^{AB}$ if the wave functions of the subsystems are already antisymmetric.

== See also ==
- Anticommutative property
- Slater determinant
- Identical particles
