= Exchange operator =

Quantum mechanical operator interchanging particle states as arguments to a function

In quantum mechanics, the exchange operator $\hat{P}$, also known as permutation operator, is a quantum mechanical operator that acts on states in Fock space. The exchange operator acts by switching the labels on any two identical particles described by the joint position quantum state $\left|x_1, x_2\right\rangle$. Since the particles are identical, the notion of exchange symmetry requires that the exchange operator be unitary.

== Construction ==
Anticlockwise rotation

Clockwise rotation

Exchange of two particles in 2 + 1 spacetime by rotation. The rotations are inequivalent, since one cannot be deformed into the other (without the worldlines leaving the plane, an impossibility in 2d space).

In three or higher dimensions, the exchange operator can represent a literal exchange of the positions of the pair of particles by motion of the particles in an adiabatic process, with all other particles held fixed. Such motion is often not carried out in practice. Rather, the operation is treated as a "what if" similar to a parity inversion or time reversal operation. Consider two repeated operations of such a particle exchange:

$$\hat{P}\left|x_1, x_2\right\rangle = \left|x_2, x_1\right\rangle$$

$$\hat{P}^2\left|x_1, x_2\right\rangle = \hat{P}\left|x_2, x_1\right\rangle = \left|x_1, x_2\right\rangle$$

Therefore, $\hat{P}$ is not only unitary but also an operator square root of 1, which leaves the possibilities

$$\hat{P}\left|x_1, x_2\right\rangle = \pm \left|x_2, x_1\right\rangle\,.$$

Both signs are realized in nature. Particles satisfying the case of +1 are called bosons, and particles satisfying the case of −1 are called fermions. The spin–statistics theorem dictates that all particles with integer spin are bosons whereas all particles with half-integer spin are fermions.

The exchange operator commutes with the Hamiltonian and is therefore a conserved quantity. Therefore, it is always possible and usually most convenient to choose a basis in which the states are eigenstates of the exchange operator. Such a state is either completely symmetric under exchange of all identical bosons or completely antisymmetric under exchange of all identical fermions of the system. To do so for fermions, for example, the antisymmetrizer builds such a completely antisymmetric state.

In 2 dimensions, the adiabatic exchange of particles is not necessarily possible. Instead, the eigenvalues of the exchange operator may be complex phase factors (in which case $\hat{P}$ is not Hermitian), see anyon for this case. The exchange operator is not well defined in a strictly 1-dimensional system, though there are constructions of 1-dimensional networks that behave as effective 2-dimensional systems.

== Quantum chemistry ==
In the Hartree–Fock method of quantum chemistry, the exchange operator is usually defined as:

$$\hat K_j f_i(\vec x_1) = \phi_j(\vec x_1) \int \frac{\phi_j^*(\vec x_2) f_i(\vec x_2) } {|\vec x_1 - \vec x_2|} d x_2^3$$

where $\hat K_j$ is exchange operator, $\phi_j(\vec x_1)$ is the $j$-th orbital, and $f_i(\vec x)$ is a one-electron orbital acted by $\hat K_j$. The above expression reflects the exchange between the electrons on the $i$-th and $j$-th orbitals.

== See also ==
- Exchange interaction
- Hamiltonian (quantum mechanics)
- Coulomb operator
- Exchange symmetry or permutation symmetry
