= Hartree equations =

Equation in solid state physics

In solid-state physics and quantum chemistry, the Hartree equations or the self-consistent field approximation are a set of non-linear equations used to study many-electron systems inside a metal. These quantum mechanical equations are self-consistent, meaning that the solutions can be found by iteration. These approximation is the result of a mean-field theory that describes one electron interacting with a field that is the result of averaging the position of the rest of electrons. The equations are named after Douglas Hartree, who introduced them in 1927.

Hartree method is one of the main ingredients of Hartree–Fock method, which improves on Hartree equations by including the exchange interaction.

== History ==
In 1927, a year after the publication of the Schrödinger equation, Hartree formulated what are now known as the Hartree equations for atoms, using the concept of self-consistency that Robert Bruce Lindsay had introduced in his study of many electron systems in the context of Bohr theory. Hartree assumed that the nucleus together with the electrons formed a spherically symmetric field. The charge distribution of each electron was the solution of the Schrödinger equation for an electron in a potential $v(r)$, derived from the field. Self-consistency required that the final field, computed from the solutions, was self-consistent with the initial field, and he thus called his method the self-consistent field method.

In order to solve the equation of an electron in a spherical potential, Hartree first introduced atomic units to eliminate physical constants. Then he converted the Laplacian from Cartesian to spherical coordinates to show that the solution was a product of a radial function $P(r)/r$ and a spherical harmonic with an angular quantum number $\ell$, namely $\psi=(1/r)P(r)S_\ell(\theta,\phi)$. The equation for the radial function was

$$\frac{\mathrm d^2P(r)}{\mathrm dr^2} + \left\{2[E-v(r)] - \frac{\ell(\ell+1)}{r^2}\right\}P(r)=0.$$

== Hartree product ==
The wavefunction which describes all of the electrons, $\Psi$, is almost always too complex to calculate directly. Hartree's original method was to first calculate the solutions to Schrödinger's equation for individual electrons 1, 2, 3, $...$, p, in the states $\alpha, \beta, \gamma, ..., \pi$, which yields individual solutions: $\psi_{\alpha}(\mathbf{x}_1), \psi_{\beta}(\mathbf{x}_2), \psi_{\gamma}(\mathbf{x}_3), ..., \psi_{\pi}(\mathbf{x}_p)$. Since each $\psi$ is a solution to the Schrödinger equation by itself, their product should at least approximate a solution. This simple method of combining the wavefunctions of the individual electrons is known as the Hartree product:

$$\Psi(\mathbf{x}_1,\mathbf{x}_2,\mathbf{x}_3, ..., \mathbf{x}_p) = \psi_{\alpha}(\mathbf{x}_1)\psi_{\beta}(\mathbf{x}_2)\psi_{\gamma}(\mathbf{x}_3)...\psi_{\pi}(\mathbf{x}_p)$$

This Hartree product gives us the wavefunction of a system (many-particle) as a combination of wavefunctions of the individual particles. It is inherently mean-field (assumes the particles are independent) and is the unsymmetrized version of the Slater determinant ansatz in the Hartree–Fock method. Although it has the advantage of simplicity, the Hartree product is not satisfactory for fermions, such as electrons, because the resulting wave function is not antisymmetric. An antisymmetric wave function can be mathematically described using the Slater determinant.

== Derivation ==
Let's start from a Hamiltonian of one atom with Z electrons. The same method with some modifications can be expanded to a monoatomic crystal using the Born–von Karman boundary condition and to a crystal with a basis.

$$\hat {H} = - \frac {\hbar^2}{2m}\sum_{i}\nabla^2_{\mathbf{r}_i} - \sum_{i}\frac{Ze^2}{4\pi \epsilon_0 |\mathbf{r}_i|}+\frac{1}{2} \sum_{i\neq j}\frac{e^2}{4\pi \epsilon_0 |\mathbf{r}_i-\mathbf{r}_j|}$$

The expectation value is given by

$$\langle\psi|\hat{H}|\psi\rangle= \int \psi^{*}(\mathbf{r}_1,s_1,...,\mathbf{r}_Z,s_Z)\hat{H}\psi(\mathbf{r}_1,s_1,...,\mathbf{r}_Z,s_Z)\prod_i d\mathbf{r}_i$$

Where the $s_i$ are the spins of the different particles. In general we approximate this potential with a mean field which is also unknown and needs to be found together with the eigenfunctions of the problem. We will also neglect all relativistic effects like spin-orbit and spin-spin interactions.

== Hartree derivation ==
At the time of Hartree, the full Pauli exclusion principle was not yet invented. The exclusion principle was only clear in terms of quantum numbers; it was not yet clear that the wave function of electrons was required to be anti-symmetric. If we start from the assumption that the wave functions of each electron are independent we can assume that the total wave function is the product of the single wave functions and that the total charge density at position $\mathbf{r}$ due to all electrons except i is

$$\rho(\mathbf{r}) = -e \sum_{i \neq j} | \phi_{n_j}(\mathbf{r})|^2$$

Where we neglected the spin here for simplicity.

This charge density creates an extra mean potential:

$$\nabla^2 V(\mathbf{r}) = - \frac{\rho(\mathbf{r})}{\epsilon_0}$$

The solution can be written as the Coulomb integral

$$V(\mathbf{r}) = \frac{1}{4\pi\epsilon_0} \int \frac{\rho(\mathbf{r'})}{|\mathbf{r}-\mathbf{r'}| } d\mathbf{r'} = - \frac{e}{4\pi\epsilon_0}\sum_{i \neq j} \int \frac{| \phi_{n_j}(\mathbf{r'})|^2}{|\mathbf{r}-\mathbf{r'}| } d\mathbf{r'}$$

If we now consider the electron i this will also satisfy the time independent Schrödinger equation

$$\left[-\frac{\hbar \nabla^2}{2m} - \frac{Ze^2}{4 \pi \epsilon_0 |\mathbf{r}|} -e V(\mathbf{r}) \right] \phi_{n_i} = \Epsilon_i  \phi_{n_i}$$

This is interesting on its own because it can be compared with a single particle problem in a continuous medium where the dielectric constant is given by:

$$\varepsilon(\mathbf{r})=\frac{\epsilon_0}{1 + \frac {4 \pi \epsilon_0}{Ze} |\mathbf{r}|V(\mathbf{r})}$$

Where $V(\mathbf{r})<0$ and $\varepsilon(\mathbf{r}) > \epsilon_0$

Finally, we have the system of Hartree equations

$$\left[-\frac{\hbar \nabla^2}{2m} - \frac{Ze^2}{4 \pi \epsilon_0 |\mathbf{r}|} + \frac{e^2}{4\pi\epsilon_0}\sum_{i \neq j} \int \frac{| \phi_{n_j}(\mathbf{r'})|^2}{|\mathbf{r}-\mathbf{r'}| } d\mathbf{r'} \right] \phi_{n_i} = \Epsilon_i  \phi_{n_i}$$

This is a non linear system of integro-differential equations, but it is interesting in a computational setting because we can solve them iteratively.

Namely, we start from a set of known eigenfunctions (which in this simplified mono-atomic example can be the ones of the hydrogen atom) and starting initially from the potential $V(\mathbf{r})=0$ computing at each iteration a new version of the potential from the charge density above and then a new version of the eigen-functions, ideally these iterations converge.

From the convergence of the potential we can say that we have a "self consistent" mean field, i.e. a continuous variation from a known potential with known solutions to an averaged mean field potential. In that sense the potential is consistent and not so different from the originally used one as ansatz.

== Slater–Gaunt derivation ==
In 1928, John C. Slater and John Arthur Gaunt independently showed that given the Hartree product approximation:

$$\psi(\mathbf{r}_1,s_1,...,\mathbf{r}_Z,s_Z) = \prod_i^Z \phi_{n_i}(\mathbf{r}_i,s_i)$$

They started from the following variational condition

$$\delta\left( \langle \prod_i \phi_{n_i}(\mathbf{r}_i,s_i)|\hat{H}|\prod_i \phi_{n_i}(\mathbf{r}_i,s_i) \rangle - \sum_i \epsilon_i \langle\phi_{n_i}(\mathbf{r}_i,s_i)|\phi_{n_i}(\mathbf{r}_i,s_i)\rangle\right) = 0$$

where the $\epsilon_i$ are the Lagrange multipliers needed in order to minimize the functional of the mean energy $\langle\psi|\hat{H}|\psi\rangle$. The orthogonal conditions acts as constraints in the scope of the lagrange multipliers. From here they managed to derive the Hartree equations.

== Fock and Slater determinant approach ==
In 1930, Vladimir Fock and Slater independently then used the Slater determinant instead of the Hartree product for the wave function

$$\psi(\mathbf{r}_1,s_1,...,\mathbf{r}_Z,s_Z) = \frac{1}{\sqrt{Z!}}
\det \begin{bmatrix}
\phi_{n_1}(\mathbf{r}_1,s_1) & \phi_{n_1}(\mathbf{r}_2,s_2) & ... & \phi_{n_1}(\mathbf{r}_Z,s_Z) \\
\phi_{n_2}(\mathbf{r}_1,s_1) & \phi_{n_2}(\mathbf{r}_2,s_2) & ... & \phi_{n_2}(\mathbf{r}_Z,s_Z) \\
... & ... & ... & ...\\
\phi_{n_Z}(\mathbf{r}_1,s_1) & \phi_{n_Z}(\mathbf{r}_2,s_2) & ... & \phi_{n_Z}(\mathbf{r}_Z,s_Z)\end{bmatrix}$$

This determinant guarantees the exchange symmetry (i.e. if the two columns are swapped the determinant change sign) and the Pauli principle if two electronic states are identical there are two identical rows and therefore the determinant is zero.

They then applied the same variational condition as above

$$\delta\left( \langle \psi(\mathbf{r}_i,s_i)|\hat{H}|\psi(\mathbf{r}_i,s_i) \rangle - \sum_i \epsilon_i \langle\phi_{n_i}(\mathbf{r}_i,s_i)|\phi_{n_i}(\mathbf{r}_i,s_i)\rangle\right) = 0$$

Where now the $\phi_{n_i}$ are a generic orthogonal set of eigen-functions $\langle \phi_{n_i}(\mathbf{r},s_i)|\phi_{n_j}(\mathbf{r},s_j)\rangle=\delta_{ij}$ from which the wave function is built. The orthogonal conditions acts as constraints in the scope of the lagrange multipliers. From this they derived the Hartree–Fock method.

== In mathematics ==
In mathematics, the Hartree equation, is given by

$$i\,\partial_tu + \nabla^2 u= V(u)u$$

in $\mathbb{R}^{d+1}$ where

$$V(u)= \pm |x|^{-n} * |u|^2$$

and

$$0 < n < d$$

The non-linear Schrödinger equation is in some sense a limiting case.
