= George G. Hall =

Northern Irish applied mathematician

- Born: George Garfield Hall; 5 March 1925; Belfast, Northern Ireland
- Died: 6 May 2018 (aged 93); Nottingham, England
- Education: Queen's University Belfast; Cambridge University
- Occupations: mathematician, professor

George Garfield Hall (5 March 1925 – 6 May 2018) was a Northern Irish applied mathematician known for original work and contributions to the field of quantum chemistry. Independently from Clemens C. J. Roothaan, Hall discovered the Roothaan-Hall equations.

== Education and career ==
Hall was educated at Queen's University Belfast and St John's College, Cambridge, where he studied for a PhD under the supervision of John Lennard-Jones. For his work on the Roothaan-Hall equations, Hall was awarded a doctorate by the University of Cambridge in 1950. He then lectured at Cambridge as a Research Assistant in theoretical chemistry, before being elected to a Fellowship at St John's College in 1953. From 1955 to 1962 he lectured in Mathematics at Imperial College London. In 1957–58 he spent a year with Per-Olov Löwdin in Uppsala, Sweden. He became Professor of Mathematics at the University of Nottingham in 1962. In 1982 he took early retirement from Nottingham and was appointed an emeritus professor. He moved in 1983 to Kyoto University, Japan, returning to Nottingham in 1988. He has collaborated with (inter alia) A.T. Amos, K. Collard, and D. Rees. He was Emeritus Professor and Senior Research Fellow in the Shell Centre for Mathematical Education at the University of Nottingham.

He was awarded several honorary degrees for his work: a DSc by Maynooth University (2004), a ScD by Cambridge University and a DEng by Kyoto University. He was a member of the International Academy of Quantum Molecular Science.

Hall had three children and six grandchildren. He died peacefully in Nottingham at the age of 93 on 6 May 2018.

== Books ==
- G. G. Hall, Matrices and tensors. Pergamon (1963).
- G. G. Hall, Applied Group Theory. Longman (1965) & American Elsevier Publishing Co., Inc. (1967).
- G. G. Hall, Molecular Solid-State Physics. Springer (1991).
