= Coulomb operator =

Quantum mechanical operator used in the field of quantum chemistry

The Coulomb operator, named after Charles-Augustin de Coulomb, is a quantum mechanical operator used in the field of quantum chemistry. Specifically, it is a term found in the Fock operator. It is defined as:

$$\widehat J_j (1) f_i(1)= f_i(1) \int { \left | \varphi_j(2) \right | }^2 \frac{1}{r_{12}}\,dr_2$$

where

$\widehat J_j (1)$ is the one-electron Coulomb operator defining the repulsion resulting from electron j,

$f_i(1)$ is the one-electron wavefunction of the $i^{th}$ electron being acted upon by the Coulomb operator,

$\varphi_j(2)$ is the one-electron wavefunction of the $j^{th}$ electron,

$r_{ij}$ is the distance between electrons $(i)$ and $(j)$.

== See also ==
- Core Hamiltonian
- Exchange operator
