= John Hartree =

Australian rules footballer

Personal information
- Full name: John Hartree
- Born: 3 January 1948 (age 78)
- Original team: Kensington
- Height: 187 cm (6 ft 2 in)
- Weight: 84 kg (185 lb)

Playing career^{1}
Years	Club	Games (Goals)
1969	South Melbourne	1 (1)
- ^{1} Playing statistics correct to the end of 1969.

John Hartree (born 3 January 1948) is a former Australian rules footballer who played with South Melbourne in the Victorian Football League (VFL).
