= Anticommutative property =

Sum of a product and its opposite equals zero.

In mathematics, pairs of elements a and b in a ring or algebra may have the anticommutative property: ab = − ba. The property is true of the binary operation of subtraction.

As ab – ba = 0 expresses commutativity, so ab + ba = 0 expresses anti-commutativity.

== Instances ==
For example, matrix multiplication of these 2x2 matrices, with entries from a ring with −1, anticommute:

$$\begin{pmatrix}0 & 1 \\ 1 & 0 \end{pmatrix}\times \begin{pmatrix}1 & 0 \\ 0 & -1 \end{pmatrix} = \begin{pmatrix}0 & -1 \\ 1 & 0 \end{pmatrix}$$
$$\begin{pmatrix}1 & 0 \\ 0 & -1\end{pmatrix}\times \begin{pmatrix}0 & 1 \\ 1 & 0 \end{pmatrix} = \begin{pmatrix}0 & 1 \\ -1 & 0 \end{pmatrix}$$

Here the reversed order of factors results in the additive inverse matrix.

In multilinear algebra over a field, the wedge product has the anticommutative property.

Sophus Lie used the commutator on a continuous group to study the structure with Lie algebra. The commutator of two group elements g and h is $[g, h] = gh - hg ,$ which is anticommutative.

W. R. Hamilton initiated the study of quaternion algebras which exhibit anticommutativity of some elements.

When an algebra has all basis elements anticommute with each other, and have squares equal to one, then the square of a general element equals the sum of the squares of the coordinates since anticommutativity implies cross products sum to zero:

If $e_i^2 = 1, \quad e_i e_j + e_j e_i = 0, i \ne j\ ,\quad \text{then} \quad (\sum_{i=1}^n x_i e_i )^2 = \sum_{i=1}^n x_i^2 .$

== Quaternion algebras ==
Given a field F , the vector space (F^{4}, + ) is made into a quaternion algebra Q by defining some vector products according to the anti-commutative rule. One dimension of Q commutes with all the others, it is the scalar field F. The other three dimensions of Q are denoted i, j, and k, so that {1, i, j, k} is a basis of Q. The multiplication x in Q = (F^{4}, + , x ) is anticommutative when different i, j, or k are factors. The product x may be as in the quaternion group or as in the dihedral group of order eight.

== Fermions ==
In quantum mechanics the permutation of factors is accomplished with the exchange operator. In 1926 P. A. M. Dirac wrote "the variables that describe a dynamical system do not obey the commutative law of multiplication but satisfy instead certain quantum conditions." The resulting Fermi–Dirac statistics uses commutativity and anticommutativity to distinguish bosons from fermions. Dirac used the term antisymmetrical: "An antisymmetrical eigenfunction vanishes identically when two of the electrons are in the same orbit. This means that in the solution of the problem with antisymmetrical eigenfunctions there can be no stationary states with two or more electrons in the same orbit, which is just Pauli's exclusion principle." One the other hand, David Hestenes uses antisymmetric on page 8 of his book Spacetime Algebra (1966) but later uses the term anticommutative.

== Tensor index transposition ==
In the Ricci calculus of tensors, the anticommutative property is seen as the parity of a permutation of indices of a tensor. As part of tensor calculus, the property is definitive for the Levi-Civita symbol, and demonstrated with antisymmetric tensors. The term skew-symmetric was used by Alfred Schild and John L. Synge in their textbook.
