= Clemens C. J. Roothaan =

Dutch physical chemist (1918–2019)

- Born: Clemens Carel Johannes Roothaan; August 29, 1918; Nijmegen, Netherlands
- Died: June 17, 2019 (aged 100); Chicago, Illinois, US
- Education: Delft University of Technology; University of Chicago
- Known for: Roothaan equations
- Relatives: Jan Roothaan (great-great-great uncle)
- Scientific career
- Workplaces: University of Chicago
- Doctoral advisor: Robert S. Mulliken

Clemens Carel Johannes Roothaan (August 29, 1918 – June 17, 2019) was a Dutch physicist and chemist known for his development of the self-consistent field theory of molecular structure.

== Biography ==
Roothaan was born in Nijmegen. He enrolled TU Delft in 1935 to study electrical engineering. Roothaan was studying physics at university when World War II broke out. As a Catholic citizen, he was temporarily allowed to continue studying. During World War II his brother Vic was involved with the Dutch Resistance, and when German soldiers came to the house looking for him they didn’t find Vic, but took Clemens Roothaan and his younger brother Jan instead. Later he and his brother Jan were sent to the Vught concentration camp for suspected involvement with the Dutch Resistance. On September 5, 1944, the remaining prisoners of the camp (including the Roothaan brothers) were moved to the Sachsenhausen camp in Germany ahead of the advancing Allies. Near the end of the war, the Sachsenhausen inmates were sent on a death march which Roothaan's brother did not survive.

While a prisoner of war he was able to pursue his studies in physics together with other professors and students under the formal guidance of Philips. The work he was assigned to while cooperating with Philips was a foundation for his master's thesis. He obtained his master's degree in physics from TU Delft on October 14, 1945. After that he moved to USA, where he did his PhD thesis with Robert S. Mulliken from the University of Chicago, on semiempirical MO theory, while holding a post at The Catholic University of America in Washington, D.C.. He realised that the then current approach to molecular orbital theory was incorrect and changed his topic to what resulted in the development of the Roothaan equations. Prof. Mulliken mentions this work in his Nobel lecture as follows:

I tried to induce Roothaan to do his Ph.D. thesis on Hückel-type calculations on substituted benzenes. But after carrying out some very good calculations on these he revolted against the Hückel method, threw his excellent calculations out the window, and for his thesis developed entirely independently his now well known all-electron LCAO self-consistent-field method for the calculation of atomic and molecular wave functions, now appropriately referred to, I believe, as the Hartree-Fock-Roothaan method.

— Robert S. Mulliken

He had moved to the University of Chicago in 1949 and his PhD was awarded in 1950. He then joined the Physics Department of the University of Chicago. From 1962 to 1968 he was Director of the University of Chicago Computation Center. Later he was Professor of Physics and Chemistry at the University of Chicago. Since his retirement, in 1988, he had worked for the Hewlett-Packard Laboratories in Palo Alto, California, where his primary contribution had been in the development of the mathematical coprocessor routines for the Itanium chip. His method of analyzing pipeline architecture had been unique and innovative and greatly admired in supercomputer circles around the world.

In 1982 Roothaan became a correspondent of the Royal Netherlands Academy of Arts and Sciences. He was a member of the International Academy of Quantum Molecular Science and the Society of Catholic Scientists. He turned 100 in August 2018 and died in June 2019.

== Works ==
=== Autobiographies ===
- Roothaan, Clemens C. J. (1991). "My life as a physicist: Memories and perspectives". Journal of Molecular Structure: THEOCHEM. 234: 1–12. doi:10.1016/0166-1280(91)89002-I.
- Roothaan, Clemens C. J. (1993). "My life as a physicist: Memories and perspectives". International Journal of Quantum Chemistry. 48 (S27): 1–11. doi:10.1002/qua.560480804.

== See also ==
- Restricted open-shell Hartree–Fock
