= Indistinguishable particles =

Concept in quantum mechanics of perfectly substitutable particles

In quantum mechanics, indistinguishable particles (also called identical or indiscernible particles) are particles that cannot be distinguished from one another, even in principle. Species of identical particles include, but are not limited to, elementary particles (such as electrons), composite subatomic particles (such as atomic nuclei), as well as atoms and molecules. Although all known indistinguishable particles only exist at the quantum scale, there is no exhaustive list of all possible sorts of particles nor a clear-cut limit of applicability, as explored in quantum statistics. They were first discussed by Werner Heisenberg and Paul Dirac in 1926.

There are two main categories of identical particles: bosons, which can share quantum states, and fermions, which cannot (as described by the Pauli exclusion principle). Examples of bosons are photons, gluons, phonons, helium-4 nuclei and all mesons. Examples of fermions are electrons, neutrinos, quarks, protons, neutrons, and helium-3 nuclei.

The fact that particles can be identical has important consequences in statistical mechanics, where calculations rely on probabilistic arguments, which are sensitive to whether or not the objects being studied are identical. As a result, identical particles exhibit markedly different statistical behaviour from distinguishable particles. For example, the indistinguishability of particles has been proposed as a solution to Gibbs' mixing paradox.

== Distinguishing between particles ==
There are two methods for distinguishing between particles. The first method relies on differences in the intrinsic physical properties of the particles, such as mass, electric charge, and spin. If differences exist, it is possible to distinguish between the particles by measuring the relevant properties. If microscopic particles with equivalent physical properties were described by classical physics, a second method for distinguishing between particles is to track the trajectory of each particle. As long as the position of each particle can be measured, even when the particles collide, then there would be no ambiguity about which particle is which. However, microscopic identical particles are described by principles of quantum mechanics. According to quantum theory, the particles do not possess definite positions. The particles are then said to be indistinguishable.

== Quantum mechanical description ==
=== Symmetrical and antisymmetrical states ===
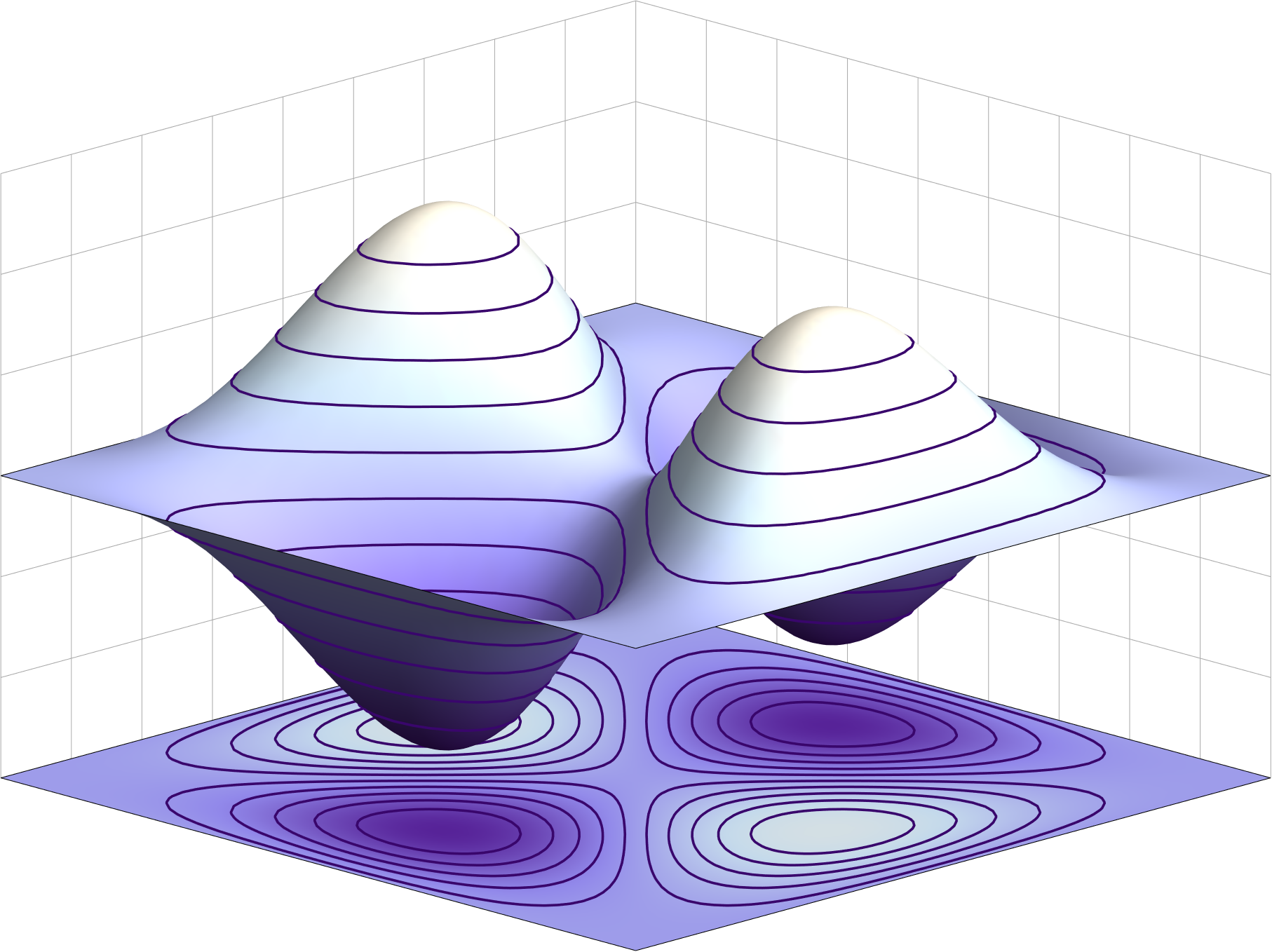
Antisymmetric wavefunction for a (fermionic) 2-particle state in an infinite square well potential

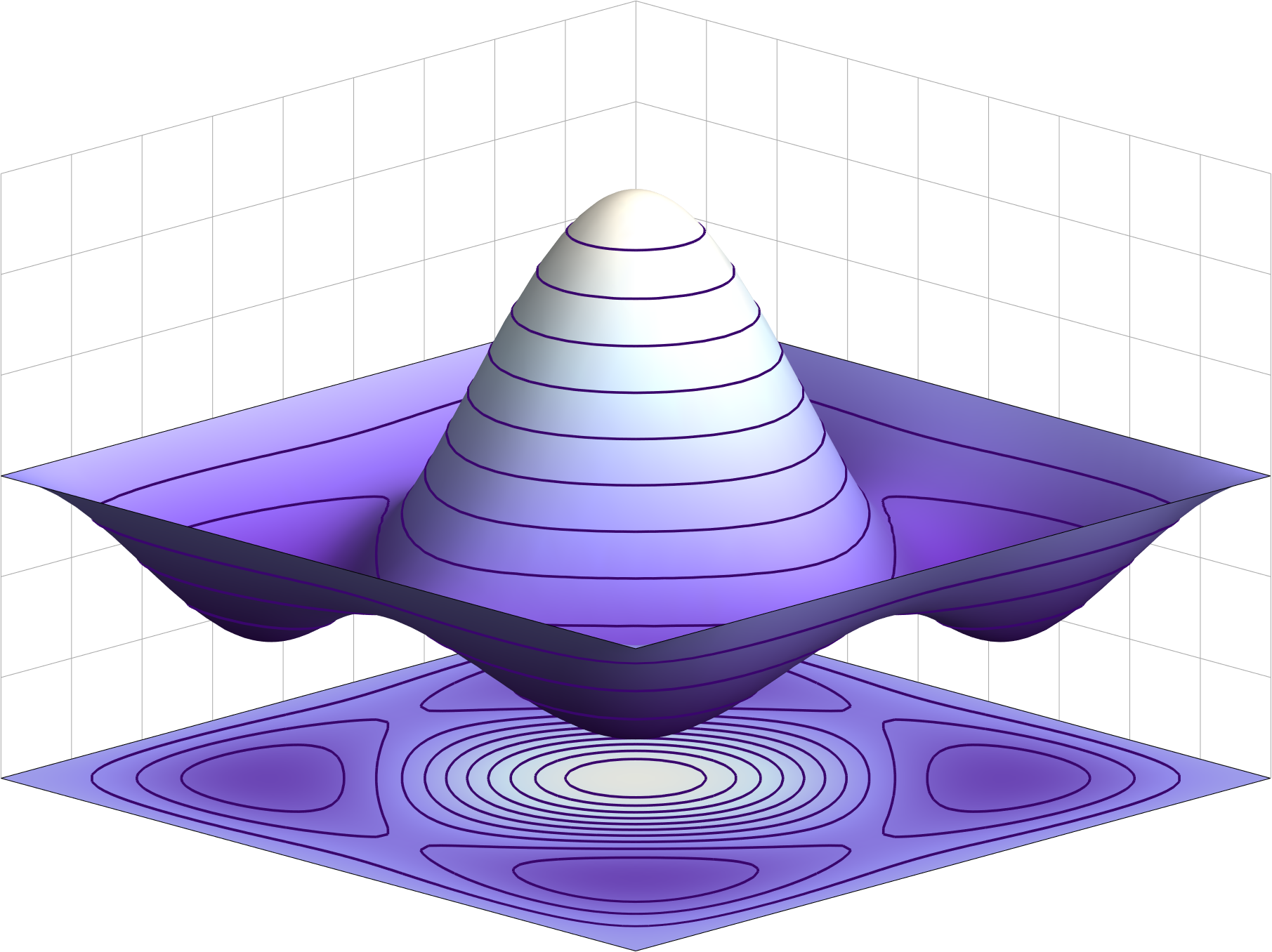
Symmetric wavefunction for a (bosonic) 2-particle state in an infinite square well potential

What follows is an example to make the above discussion concrete, using the formalism developed in the article on the mathematical formulation of quantum mechanics.

Let n denote a complete set of (discrete) quantum numbers for specifying single-particle states (for example, for the particle in a box problem, take n to be the quantized wave vector of the wavefunction.) For simplicity, consider a system composed of two particles that are not interacting with each other. Suppose that one particle is in the state n_{1}, and the other is in the state n_{2}. The quantum state of the system is denoted by the expression

$$| n_1 \rang | n_2 \rang$$

where the order of the tensor product matters ( if $| n_2 \rang | n_1 \rang$, then the particle 1 occupies the state n_{2} while the particle 2 occupies the state n_{1}). This is the canonical way of constructing a basis for a tensor product space $H \otimes H$ of the combined system from the individual spaces. This expression is valid for distinguishable particles, however, it is not appropriate for indistinguishable particles since $|n_1\rang |n_2\rang$ and $|n_2\rang |n_1\rang$ as a result of exchanging the particles are generally different states.

- "the particle 1 occupies the n_{1} state and the particle 2 occupies the n_{2} state" ≠ "the particle 1 occupies the n_{2} state and the particle 2 occupies the n_{1} state".

Two states are physically equivalent only if they differ at most by a complex phase factor. For two indistinguishable particles, a state before the particle exchange must be physically equivalent to the state after the exchange, so these two states differ at most by a complex phase factor. This fact suggests that a state for two indistinguishable (and non-interacting) particles is given by following two possibilities:

$$|n_1\rang |n_2\rang \pm |n_2\rang |n_1\rang$$

States where it is a sum are known as symmetric, while states involving the difference are called antisymmetric. More completely, symmetric states have the form

$$|n_1, n_2; S\rang \equiv \mbox{constant} \times \bigg( |n_1\rang |n_2\rang + |n_2\rang |n_1\rang \bigg)$$

while antisymmetric states have the form

$$|n_1, n_2; A\rang \equiv \mbox{constant} \times \bigg( |n_1\rang |n_2\rang - |n_2\rang |n_1\rang \bigg)$$

Note that if n_{1} and n_{2} are the same, the antisymmetric expression gives zero, which cannot be a state vector since it cannot be normalized. In other words, more than one identical particle cannot occupy an antisymmetric state (one antisymmetric state can be occupied only by one particle). This is known as the Pauli exclusion principle, and it is the fundamental reason behind the chemical properties of atoms and the stability of matter.

=== Exchange symmetry ===
The importance of symmetric and antisymmetric states is ultimately based on empirical evidence. It appears to be a fact of nature that identical particles do not occupy states of a mixed symmetry, such as

$$|n_1, n_2; ?\rang = \mbox{constant} \times \bigg( |n_1\rang |n_2\rang + i |n_2\rang |n_1\rang \bigg)$$

There is actually an exception to this rule, which will be discussed later. On the other hand, it can be shown that the symmetric and antisymmetric states are in a sense special, by examining a particular symmetry of the multiple-particle states known as exchange symmetry.

Define a linear operator P, called the exchange operator. When it acts on a tensor product of two state vectors, it exchanges the values of the state vectors:

$$P \bigg(|\psi\rang |\phi\rang \bigg) \equiv |\phi\rang |\psi\rang$$

P is both Hermitian and unitary. Because it is unitary, it can be regarded as a symmetry operator. This symmetry may be described as the symmetry under the exchange of labels attached to the particles (i.e., to the single-particle Hilbert spaces).

Clearly, $P^2 = 1$ (the identity operator), so the eigenvalues of P are +1 and −1. The corresponding eigenvectors are the symmetric and antisymmetric states:

$$P|n_1, n_2; S\rang = + |n_1, n_2; S\rang$$
$$P|n_1, n_2; A\rang = - |n_1, n_2; A\rang$$

In other words, symmetric and antisymmetric states are essentially unchanged under the exchange of particle labels: they are only multiplied by a factor of +1 or −1, rather than being "rotated" somewhere else in the Hilbert space. This indicates that the particle labels have no physical meaning, in agreement with the earlier discussion on indistinguishability.

Since P is Hermitian, it can be regarded as an observable of the system: a measurement can be performed to find out if a state is symmetric or antisymmetric. Furthermore, the equivalence of the particles indicates that the Hamiltonian can be written in a symmetrical form, such as

$$H = \frac{p_1^2}{2m} + \frac{p_2^2}{2m} + U(|x_1 - x_2|) + V(x_1) + V(x_2)$$

It is possible to show that such Hamiltonians satisfy the commutation relation

$$\left[P, H\right] = 0$$

According to the Heisenberg equation, this means that the value of P is a constant of motion. If the quantum state is initially symmetric (antisymmetric), it will remain symmetric (antisymmetric) as the system evolves. Mathematically, this says that the state vector is confined to one of the two eigenspaces of P, and is not allowed to range over the entire Hilbert space. Thus, that eigenspace might as well be treated as the actual Hilbert space of the system. This is the idea behind the definition of Fock space.

=== Fermions and bosons ===
The choice of symmetry or antisymmetry is determined by the species of particle. For example, symmetric states must always be used when describing photons or helium-4 atoms, and antisymmetric states when describing electrons or protons.

Particles which exhibit symmetric states are called bosons. The nature of symmetric states has important consequences for the statistical properties of systems composed of many identical bosons. These statistical properties are described as Bose–Einstein statistics.

Particles which exhibit antisymmetric states are called fermions. Antisymmetry gives rise to the Pauli exclusion principle, which forbids identical fermions from sharing the same quantum state. Systems of many identical fermions are described by Fermi–Dirac statistics.

Parastatistics are mathematically possible, but no examples exist in nature.

In certain two-dimensional systems, mixed symmetry can occur. These exotic particles are known as anyons, and they obey fractional statistics. Experimental evidence for the existence of anyons exists in the fractional quantum Hall effect, a phenomenon observed in the two-dimensional electron gases that form the inversion layer of MOSFETs. There is another type of statistic, known as braid statistics, which are associated with particles known as plektons.

The spin-statistics theorem relates the exchange symmetry of identical particles to their spin. It states that bosons have integer spin, and fermions have half-integer spin. Anyons possess fractional spin.

=== N particles ===
The above discussion generalizes readily to the case of N particles. Suppose there are N particles with quantum numbers n_{1}, n_{2}, ..., n_{N}. If the particles are bosons, they occupy a totally symmetric state, which is symmetric under the exchange of any two particle labels:

$$|n_1 n_2 \cdots n_N; S\rang = \sqrt{\frac{1}{N!\prod_n m_n!}} \sum_p \left|n_{p(1)}\right\rang \left|n_{p(2)}\right\rang \cdots \left|n_{p(N)}\right\rang$$

Here, the sum is taken over all different states under permutations p acting on N elements. The square root left to the sum is a normalizing constant. The quantity m_{n} stands for the number of times each of the single-particle states n appears in the N-particle state. Note that Σ_{n} m_{n} = N.

In the same vein, fermions occupy totally antisymmetric states:

$$|n_1 n_2 \cdots n_N; A\rang = \frac{1}{\sqrt{N!}} \sum_p \operatorname{sgn}(p) \left|n_{p(1)}\right\rang \left|n_{p(2)}\right\rang \cdots \left|n_{p(N)}\right\rang\$$

Here, sgn(p) is the sign of each permutation (i.e. $+1$ if $p$ is composed of an even number of transpositions, and $-1$ if odd). Note that there is no $\Pi_n m_n$ term, because each single-particle state can appear only once in a fermionic state. Otherwise the sum would again be zero due to the antisymmetry, thus representing a physically impossible state. This is the Pauli exclusion principle for many particles.

These states have been normalized so that

$$\lang n_1 n_2 \cdots n_N; S | n_1 n_2 \cdots n_N; S\rang = 1, \qquad \lang n_1 n_2 \cdots n_N; A | n_1 n_2 \cdots n_N; A\rang = 1.$$

=== Measurement ===
Suppose there is a system of N bosons (fermions) in the symmetric (antisymmetric) state

$$|n_1 n_2 \cdots n_N; S/A \rang$$

and a measurement is performed on some other set of discrete observables, m. In general, this yields some result m_{1} for one particle, m_{2} for another particle, and so forth. If the particles are bosons (fermions), the state after the measurement must remain symmetric (antisymmetric), i.e.

$$|m_1 m_2 \cdots m_N; S/A \rang$$

The probability of obtaining a particular result for the m measurement is

$$P_{S/A}\left(n_1, \ldots, n_N \rightarrow m_1, \ldots, m_N\right) \equiv \big|\left\lang m_1 \cdots m_N; S/A \,|\, n_1 \cdots n_N; S/A \right\rang \big|^2$$

It can be shown that

$$\sum_{m_1 \le m_2 \le \dots \le m_N} P_{S/A}(n_1, \ldots, n_N \rightarrow m_1, \ldots, m_N) = 1$$

which verifies that the total probability is 1. The sum has to be restricted to ordered values of m_{1}, ..., m_{N} to ensure that each multi-particle state is not counted more than once.

=== Wavefunction representation ===
So far, the discussion has included only discrete observables. It can be extended to continuous observables, such as the position x.

Recall that an eigenstate of a continuous observable represents an infinitesimal range of values of the observable, not a single value as with discrete observables. For instance, if a particle is in a state |ψ⟩, the probability of finding it in a region of volume d^{3}x surrounding some position x is

$$|\lang x | \psi \rang|^2 \; d^3 x$$

As a result, the continuous eigenstates |x⟩ are normalized to the delta function instead of unity:

$$\lang x | x' \rang = \delta^3 (x - x')$$

Symmetric and antisymmetric multi-particle states can be constructed from continuous eigenstates in the same way as before. However, it is customary to use a different normalizing constant:

$$\begin{align}
|x_1 x_2 \cdots x_N; S\rang &= \sqrt{\frac{1}{N!\prod_j n_j!}} \sum_p \left|x_{p(1)}\right\rang \left|x_{p(2)}\right\rang \cdots \left|x_{p(N)}\right\rang \\
|x_1 x_2 \cdots x_N; A\rang &= \frac{1}{\sqrt{N!}} \sum_p \mathrm{sgn}(p) \left|x_{p(1)}\right\rang \left|x_{p(2)}\right\rang \cdots \left|x_{p(N)}\right\rang
\end{align}$$

A many-body wavefunction can be written,

$$\begin{align}
\Psi^{(S)}_{n_1 n_2 \cdots n_N} (x_1, x_2, \ldots, x_N)
& \equiv \lang x_1 x_2 \cdots x_N; S | n_1 n_2 \cdots n_N; S \rang \\[4pt]
& = \sqrt{\frac{1}{N!\prod_j n_j!}} \sum_p \psi_{p(1)}(x_1) \psi_{p(2)}(x_2) \cdots \psi_{p(N)}(x_N) \\[10pt]
\Psi^{(A)}_{n_1 n_2 \cdots n_N} (x_1, x_2, \ldots, x_N)
& \equiv \lang x_1 x_2 \cdots x_N; A | n_1 n_2 \cdots n_N; A \rang \\[4pt]
& = \frac{1}{\sqrt{N!}} \sum_p \mathrm{sgn}(p) \psi_{p(1)}(x_1) \psi_{p(2)}(x_2) \cdots \psi_{p(N)}(x_N)
\end{align}$$

where the single-particle wavefunctions are defined, as usual, by

$$\psi_n(x) \equiv \lang x | n \rang$$

The most important property of these wavefunctions is that exchanging any two of the coordinate variables changes the wavefunction by only a plus or minus sign. This is the manifestation of symmetry and antisymmetry in the wavefunction representation:

$$\begin{align}
\Psi^{(S)}_{n_1 \cdots n_N} (\cdots x_i \cdots x_j\cdots) =
\Psi^{(S)}_{n_1 \cdots n_N} (\cdots x_j \cdots x_i \cdots) \\[3pt]
\Psi^{(A)}_{n_1 \cdots n_N} (\cdots x_i \cdots x_j\cdots) =
-\Psi^{(A)}_{n_1 \cdots n_N} (\cdots x_j \cdots x_i \cdots)
\end{align}$$

The many-body wavefunction has the following significance: if the system is initially in a state with quantum numbers n_{1}, ..., n_{N}, and a position measurement is performed, the probability of finding particles in infinitesimal volumes near x_{1}, x_{2}, ..., x_{N} is

$$N! \; \left|\Psi^{(S/A)}_{n_1 n_2 \cdots n_N} (x_1, x_2, \ldots, x_N) \right|^2 \; d^{3N}\!x$$

The factor of N! comes from our normalizing constant, which has been chosen so that, by analogy with single-particle wavefunctions,

$$\int\!\int\!\cdots\!\int\; \left|\Psi^{(S/A)}_{n_1 n_2 \cdots n_N} (x_1, x_2, \ldots, x_N)\right|^2 d^3\!x_1 d^3\!x_2 \cdots d^3\!x_N = 1$$

Because each integral runs over all possible values of x, each multi-particle state appears N! times in the integral. In other words, the probability associated with each event is evenly distributed across N! equivalent points in the integral space. Because it is usually more convenient to work with unrestricted integrals than restricted ones, the normalizing constant has been chosen to reflect this.

Finally, antisymmetric wavefunction can be written as the determinant of a matrix, known as a Slater determinant:

$$\Psi^{(A)}_{n_1 \cdots n_N} (x_1, \ldots, x_N) =
\frac{1}{\sqrt{N!}} \left|
\begin{matrix}
\psi_{n_1}(x_1) & \psi_{n_1}(x_2) & \cdots & \psi_{n_1}(x_N) \\
\psi_{n_2}(x_1) & \psi_{n_2}(x_2) & \cdots & \psi_{n_2}(x_N) \\
\vdots &          \vdots & \ddots &          \vdots \\
\psi_{n_N}(x_1) & \psi_{n_N}(x_2) & \cdots & \psi_{n_N}(x_N) \\
\end{matrix}
\right|$$

=== Operator approach and parastatistics ===
The Hilbert space for $n$ particles is given by the tensor product $\bigotimes_n H$. The permutation group of $S_n$ acts on this space by permuting the entries. By definition the expectation values for an observable $a$ of $n$ indistinguishable particles should be invariant under these permutations. This means that for all $\psi \in H$ and $\sigma \in S_n$

$$(\sigma \Psi )^t a  (\sigma \Psi)   = \Psi^t a \Psi,$$

or equivalently for each $\sigma \in S_n$

$$\sigma^t a \sigma = a$$.

Two states are equivalent whenever their expectation values coincide for all observables. If we restrict to observables of $n$ identical particles, and hence observables satisfying the equation above, we find that the following states (after normalization) are equivalent

$$\Psi \sim  \sum_{\sigma \in S_n} \lambda_{\sigma} \sigma \Psi$$.

The equivalence classes are in bijective relation with irreducible subspaces of $\bigotimes_n H$ under $S_n$.

Two obvious irreducible subspaces are the one dimensional symmetric/bosonic subspace and anti-symmetric/fermionic subspace. There are however more types of irreducible subspaces. States associated with these other irreducible subspaces are called parastatistic states. Young tableaux provide a way to classify all of these irreducible subspaces.

== Statistical properties ==
=== Statistical effects of indistinguishability ===
The indistinguishability of particles has a profound effect on their statistical properties. To illustrate this, consider a system of N distinguishable, non-interacting particles. Once again, let n_{j} denote the state (i.e. quantum numbers) of particle j. If the particles have the same physical properties, the n_{j}s run over the same range of values. Let ε(n) denote the energy of a particle in state n. As the particles do not interact, the total energy of the system is the sum of the single-particle energies. The partition function of the system is

$$Z = \sum_{n_1, n_2, \ldots, n_N} \exp\left\{ -\frac{1}{kT} \left[ \varepsilon(n_1) + \varepsilon(n_2) + \cdots + \varepsilon(n_N) \right] \right\}$$

where k is the Boltzmann constant and T is the temperature. This expression can be factored to obtain

$$Z = \xi^N$$

where

$$\xi = \sum_n \exp\left[ - \frac{\varepsilon(n)}{kT} \right].$$

If the particles are identical, this equation is incorrect. Consider a state of the system, described by the single particle states [n_{1}, ..., n_{N}]. In the equation for Z, every possible permutation of the ns occurs once in the sum, even though each of these permutations is describing the same multi-particle state. Thus, the number of states has been over-counted.

If the possibility of overlapping states is neglected, which is valid if the temperature is high, then the number of times each state is counted is approximately N!. The correct partition function is

$$Z = \frac{\xi^N}{N!}.$$

Note that this "high temperature" approximation does not distinguish between fermions and bosons.

The discrepancy in the partition functions of distinguishable and indistinguishable particles was known as far back as the 19th century, before the advent of quantum mechanics. It leads to a difficulty known as the Gibbs paradox. Gibbs showed that in the equation Z = ξ^{N}, the entropy of a classical ideal gas is

$$S = N k \ln \left(V\right) + N f(T)$$

where V is the volume of the gas and f is some function of T alone. The problem with this result is that S is not extensive – if N and V are doubled, S does not double accordingly. Such a system does not obey the postulates of thermodynamics.

Gibbs also showed that using Z = ξ^{N}/N! alters the result to

$$S = N k \ln \left(\frac{V}{N}\right) + N f(T)$$

which is perfectly extensive.

=== Statistical properties of bosons and fermions ===
There are important differences between the statistical behavior of bosons and fermions, which are described by Bose–Einstein statistics and Fermi–Dirac statistics respectively. Roughly speaking, bosons have a tendency to clump into the same quantum state, which underlies phenomena such as the laser, Bose–Einstein condensation, and superfluidity. Fermions, on the other hand, are forbidden from sharing quantum states, giving rise to systems such as the Fermi gas. This is known as the Pauli Exclusion Principle, and is responsible for much of chemistry, since the electrons in an atom (fermions) successively fill the many states within shells rather than all lying in the same lowest energy state.

The differences between the statistical behavior of fermions, bosons, and distinguishable particles can be illustrated using a system of two particles. The particles are designated A and B. Each particle can exist in two possible states, labelled $|0\rangle$ and $|1\rangle$, which have the same energy.

The composite system can evolve in time, interacting with a noisy environment. Because the $|0\rangle$ and $|1\rangle$ states are energetically equivalent, neither state is favored, so this process has the effect of randomizing the states. (This is discussed in the article on quantum entanglement.) After some time, the composite system will have an equal probability of occupying each of the states available to it. The particle states are then measured.

If A and B are distinguishable particles, then the composite system has four distinct states: $|0\rangle|0\rangle$, $|1\rangle|1\rangle$, $|0\rangle|1\rangle$, and $|1\rangle|0\rangle$. The probability of obtaining two particles in the $|0\rangle$ state is 0.25; the probability of obtaining two particles in the $|1\rangle$ state is 0.25; and the probability of obtaining one particle in the $|0\rangle$ state and the other in the $|1\rangle$ state is 0.5.

If A and B are identical bosons, then the composite system has only three distinct states: $|0\rangle|0\rangle$, $|1\rangle|1\rangle$, and $\frac{1}{\sqrt{2}}(|0\rangle|1\rangle + |1\rangle|0\rangle)$. When the experiment is performed, the probability of obtaining two particles in the $|0\rangle$ state is now 0.33; the probability of obtaining two particles in the $|1\rangle$ state is 0.33; and the probability of obtaining one particle in the $|0\rangle$ state and the other in the $|1\rangle$ state is 0.33. Note that the probability of finding particles in the same state is relatively larger than in the distinguishable case. This demonstrates the tendency of bosons to "clump".

If A and B are identical fermions, there is only one state available to the composite system: the totally antisymmetric state $\frac{1}{\sqrt{2}}(|0\rangle|1\rangle - |1\rangle|0\rangle)$. When the experiment is performed, one particle is always in the $|0\rangle$ state and the other is in the $|1\rangle$ state.

The results are summarized in Table 1:

Table 1: Statistics of two particles
Particles	Both 0	Both 1	One 0 and one 1
Distinguishable	0.25	0.25	0.5
Bosons	0.33	0.33	0.33
Fermions	0	0	1

As can be seen, even a system of two particles exhibits different statistical behaviors between distinguishable particles, bosons, and fermions. In the articles on Fermi–Dirac statistics and Bose–Einstein statistics, these principles are extended to large number of particles, with qualitatively similar results.

== Homotopy class ==
To understand why particle statistics work the way that they do, note first that particles are point-localized excitations and that particles that are spacelike separated do not interact. In a flat d-dimensional space M, at any given time, the configuration of two identical particles can be specified as an element of M × M. If there is no overlap between the particles, so that they do not interact directly, then their locations must belong to the space [M × M] \ {coincident points}, the subspace with coincident points removed. The element (x, y) describes the configuration with particle I at x and particle II at y, while (y, x) describes the interchanged configuration. With identical particles, the state described by (x, y) ought to be indistinguishable from the state described by (y, x). Now consider the homotopy class of continuous paths from (x, y) to (y, x), within the space [M × M] \ {coincident points} . If M is $\mathbb R^d$ where d ≥ 3, then this homotopy class only has one element. If M is $\mathbb R^2$, then this homotopy class has countably many elements (i.e. a counterclockwise interchange by half a turn, a counterclockwise interchange by one and a half turns, two and a half turns, etc., a clockwise interchange by half a turn, etc.). In particular, a counterclockwise interchange by half a turn is not homotopic to a clockwise interchange by half a turn. Lastly, if M is $\mathbb R$, then this homotopy class is empty.

Suppose first that d ≥ 3. The universal covering space of [M × M] ∖ {coincident points}, which is none other than [M × M] ∖ {coincident points} itself, only has two points which are physically indistinguishable from (x, y), namely (x, y) itself and (y, x). So, the only permissible interchange is to swap both particles. This interchange is an involution, so its only effect is to multiply the phase by a square root of 1. If the root is +1, then the points have Bose statistics, and if the root is –1, the points have Fermi statistics.

In the case $M = \mathbb R^2,$ the universal covering space of [M × M] ∖ {coincident points} has infinitely many points that are physically indistinguishable from (x, y). This is described by the infinite cyclic group generated by making a counterclockwise half-turn interchange. Unlike the previous case, performing this interchange twice in a row does not recover the original state; so such an interchange can generically result in a multiplication by exp(iθ) for any real θ (by unitarity, the absolute value of the multiplication must be 1). This is called anyonic statistics. In fact, even with two distinguishable particles, even though (x, y) is now physically distinguishable from (y, x), the universal covering space still contains infinitely many points which are physically indistinguishable from the original point, now generated by a counterclockwise rotation by one full turn. This generator, then, results in a multiplication by exp(iφ). This phase factor here is called the mutual statistics.

Finally, in the case $M = \mathbb R,$ the space [M × M] ∖ {coincident points} is not connected, so even if particle I and particle II are identical, they can still be distinguished via labels such as "the particle on the left" and "the particle on the right". There is no interchange symmetry here.

== See also ==
- Quasi-set theory
- DeBroglie hypothesis
