= Ansatz =

Initial estimate or framework to the solution of a mathematical problem

In physics and mathematics, an ansatz (UK: /ˈænsæts/ AN-sats, US: /ˈɑːnsɑːts/ AHN-sahts; German: [ˈʔanzats], meaning: "initial placement of a tool at a work piece", plural ansatzes or, from German, ansätze /ˈænsɛtsə/; German: [ˈʔanzɛtsə]) is an educated guess or an additional assumption made to help solve a problem, and which may later be verified to be part of the solution by its results.

== Use ==
An ansatz is the establishment of the starting equation(s), the theorem(s), or the value(s) describing a mathematical or physical problem or solution. It typically provides an initial estimate or framework to the solution of a mathematical problem. In fact, an ansatz is sometimes thought of as a "trial answer" and an important technique in solving differential equations, possibly with initial or boundary conditions.

After an ansatz, which constitutes nothing more than an assumption, has been established, the equations are solved more precisely for the general function of interest, which then constitutes a confirmation of the assumption. In essence, an ansatz makes assumptions about the form of the solution to a problem so as to make the solution easier to find.

It has been demonstrated that machine learning techniques can be applied to provide initial estimates similar to those invented by humans and to discover new ones in case no ansatz is available.

== Examples ==
Given a set of experimental data that looks to be clustered about a line, a linear ansatz could be made to find the parameters of the line by a least squares curve fit. Variational approximation methods use ansätze and then fit the parameters.

Another example could be the mass, energy, and entropy balance equations that, considered simultaneous for purposes of the elementary operations of linear algebra, are the ansatz to most basic problems of thermodynamics.

Another example of an ansatz is to suppose the solution of a homogeneous linear differential equation to take an exponential form, or a power form in the case of a difference equation. More generally, one can guess a particular solution of a system of equations, and test such an ansatz by directly substituting the solution into the system of equations. In many cases, the assumed form of the solution is general enough that it can represent arbitrary functions, in such a way that the set of solutions found this way is a full set of all the solutions.

== See also ==
- Method of undetermined coefficients
- Bayesian inference
- Bethe ansatz
- Coupled cluster
- Guesstimate
- Heuristic
- Hypothesis
- Trial and error

== Bibliography ==
- Weis, Erich; Heinrich Mattutat (1968), The New Schöffler-Weis Compact German and English Dictionary, Ernst Klett Verlag, Stuttgart, ISBN 0-245-59813-8
- Karbach, M.; Müller, G. (September 10, 1998), Introduction to the Bethe ansatz I. Computers in Physics 11 (1997), 36-43. (PDF), archived from the original (PDF) on September 1, 2006
- Karbach, M.; Hu, K.; Müller, G. (September 10, 1998), Introduction to the Bethe ansatz II. Computers in Physics 12 (1998), 565-573. (PDF), archived from the original (PDF) on September 1, 2006
- Karbach, M.; Hu, K.; Müller, G. (August 1, 2000), Introduction to the Bethe ansatz III. (PDF), archived from the original (PDF) on September 1, 2006
