= Orbital overlap =

Concentration of chemical orbitals on adjacent atoms

In chemical bonds, an orbital overlap is the concentration of orbitals on adjacent atoms in the same regions of space. Orbital overlap can lead to bond formation. The general principle for orbital overlap is that, the greater the overlap between orbitals, the greater the bond strength. Linus Pauling explained the importance of orbital overlap in the molecular bond angles observed through experimentation; it is the basis for orbital hybridization. As s orbitals are spherical (and have no directionality) and p orbitals are oriented 90° to each other, a theory was needed to explain why molecules such as methane (CH_{4}) had observed bond angles of 109.5°. Pauling proposed that s and p orbitals on the carbon atom can combine to form hybrid orbitals (sp^{3} in the case of methane) which are directed toward the hydrogen atoms. The carbon hybrid orbitals have greater overlap with the hydrogen orbitals, and can therefore form stronger C–H bonds.

A quantitative measure of the overlap of two atomic orbitals Ψ_{A} and Ψ_{B} on atoms A and B is their overlap integral, defined as

$$\mathbf{S}_\mathrm{AB}=\int \Psi_\mathrm{A}^* \Psi_\mathrm{B} \, dV,$$

where the integration extends over all space. The star on the first orbital wavefunction indicates the function's complex conjugate, which in general may be complex-valued.

== Overlap matrix ==
The overlap matrix is a square matrix, used in quantum chemistry to describe the inter-relationship of a set of basis vectors of a quantum system, such as an atomic orbital basis set used in molecular electronic structure calculations. In particular, if the vectors are orthogonal to one another, the overlap matrix will be diagonal. In addition, if the basis vectors form an orthonormal set, the overlap matrix will be the identity matrix. The overlap matrix is always n×n, where n is the number of basis functions used. It is a kind of Gramian matrix.

In general, each overlap matrix element is defined as an overlap integral:

$$\mathbf{S}_{jk}=\left \langle b_j|b_k \right \rangle=\int \Psi_j^* \Psi_k \, d\tau$$

where

$\left |b_j \right \rangle$ is the j-th basis ket (vector), and

$\Psi_j$ is the j-th wavefunction, defined as :$\Psi_j(x)=\left \langle x | b_j \right \rangle$.

In particular, if the set is normalized (though not necessarily orthogonal) then the diagonal elements will be identically 1 and the magnitude of the off-diagonal elements less than or equal to one with equality if and only if there is linear dependence in the basis set as per the Cauchy–Schwarz inequality. Moreover, the matrix is always positive definite; that is to say, the eigenvalues are all strictly positive.

== See also ==
- Roothaan equations
- Hartree–Fock method
- Pi bond
- Sigma bond
