= List of Irish Americans =

This is a list of notable Irish Americans, including both original immigrants who obtained American citizenship and their American-born descendants.

To be included in this list, the person must have a Wikipedia article and/or references showing the person is Irish American.

== List ==
=== Arts ===
- Mathew Brady – photographer
- Jean Butler – dancer; mother is from County Mayo
- Kurt Cobain – songwriter and musician, lead singer of Nirvana
- Jerome Connor – sculptor
- Auliʻi Cravalho – singer and actress
- Thomas Crawford – sculptor
- Colleen Doran – cartoonist, illustrator, writer
- Michael Flatley – dancer
- William Harnett – painter, Irish immigrant best known for trompe-l'œil renderings of still life
- George Peter Alexander Healy – portrait painter
- Thomas Hovenden – painter
- Carrie Ann Inaba – dancer, actress; mother of Chinese and Irish descent
- Gene Kelly – dancer, actor, singer, director, choreographer
- James E. Kelly – sculptor and illustrator
- Thomas Lanigan-Schmidt – artist, activist
- Edward McCartan – sculptor
- Nancy Jewel McDonie – singer, dancer, member of the South Korean group Momoland; mother is Korean and father is of Irish ancestry
- Dorothy Miner – art historian and curator
- Samuel Murray – sculptor
- Jim Morrison – singer, frontman of the Doors
- John Neagle – painter
- William Rudolf O'Donovan – sculptor
- Georgia O'Keeffe – painter
- Eileen O'Meara – animator, artist; of Irish and Italian ancestry
- Timothy H. O'Sullivan – photographer
- Maurice J. Power – sculptor, politician, foundry owner
- John Ramage – miniaturist
- George Reynolds – painter, student of Eakins, Civil War Medal of Honor
- Christopher Ross – sculptor and designer; grandfather is from Dublin
- Augustus Saint-Gaudens – sculptor; Irish mother
- Louis Saint-Gaudens – sculptor, brother of Augustus Saint-Gaudens
- John Talbott Donoghue – sculptor

=== Astronauts ===
- Eileen Collins – commander for STS-93 and STS-114; pilot for STS-63 and STS-84
- Michael Collins – Command Module Pilot for Apollo 11, 1969
- James Irwin – Lunar Module Pilot for Apollo 15
- Mark Kelly – commander for STS-124 and STS-134; pilot for STS-121 and STS-108
- Scott Kelly – NASA astronaut; he and his brother Mark are the only twins and the only siblings who have both traveled in space
- Joseph P. Kerwin – Science Pilot for Skylab 2
- James A. McDivitt - American test pilot, United States Air Force (USAF) pilot, aeronautical engineer, and NASA astronaut in the Gemini and Apollo programs.

=== Business ===
- Diamond Jim Brady – financier and philanthropist
- George Bryan – judge of Pennsylvania Supreme Court, abolitionist
- Mortimer J. Buckley - President and CEO of The Vanguard Group
- Dan and Frank Carney – founder of pizza Hut
- Ron Conway - American venture capitalist and philanthropist. He has been described as one of Silicon Valley's "super angels".
- Edward Creighton – Omaha businessman and philanthropist
- John A. Creighton (1831–1907) – Omaha businessman and philanthropist
- George Croghan – fur trader
- Michael J. Cullen – founder of King Kullen, inventor of the supermarket
- Marcus Daly (1841–1900) – A "Copper King" of Butte, Montana, United States
- Charles Stark Draper – Anglo-Irish
- Dawn Fitzpatrick – Global Head of Equities, Multi-Asset and O'Connor at UBS Asset Management
- John L. Flannery – former CEO of General Electric
- Henry Ford – founder of Ford Motor Company; Anglo-Irish
- Mark Gallogly - American private equity investor who co-founded and served as Managing Principal of the private investment firm Centerbridge Partners until his retirement in 2020
- Paul Galvin – inventor of the car radio; founder of Motorola
- James P. Gorman - chairman and CEO of Morgan Stanley
- Franklin B. Gowen – lawyer, president of the Philadelphia and Reading Railroad, prosecuted the trial against the Molly Maguires
- William Russell Grace (1832–1904) – mayor of New York City and founder of W. R. Grace and Company
- Herb Kelleher – Southwest Airlines chairman
- Joseph P. Kennedy Sr. – SEC chairman, former ambassador to the UK and father of President JFK.
- John Leahy – COO of Airbus; commercial pilot
- John C. Malone – American billionaire businessman, landowner, and philanthropist
- Richard and Maurice McDonald – founders of McDonald's
- Mike McGrath – Chief Justice of Montana Supreme Court
- Edmund McIlhenny – inventor of hot sauce
- Shane McMahon – minority owner of WWE
- Stephanie McMahon – CBO of WWE
- Vince McMahon – CEO of WWE
- Robert McNamara - President of Ford Motor Company. Known for using 1950s computer spreadsheets featuring graphs, a new idea
- Thomas Mellon – founder of Mellon Bank
- Tom Monaghan – founder of Domino's Pizza
- Brian Moynihan - chairman and CEO of Bank of America
- Pat Powers – businessman and film producer
- Bill Rancic – entrepreneur
- Joseph F. Sinnott – owner of Moore and Sinnott, the largest rye whiskey distillery in the United States before Prohibition
- Louis Sullivan – inventor of the skyscraper
- Jack Welch – former CEO of General Electric
- Mary Callahan Erdoes - CEO of J.P. Morgan Asset & Wealth Management, a division of JPMorgan Chase
- Anne Finucane - Vice chair of Bank of America and chair of the board of Bank of America Europe.
- Edward F. Crawford (businessman) - American businessman and entrepreneur
- Cathie Wood - American investor and founder, CEO and CIO of ARK Invest, an investment management firm
- William S. O'Brien - American businessman who dealt in mining stocks and operated silver mines.
- Peter McCarthy (industrialist) - Manufacturer, businessman and philanthropist
- Art Rooney - Founding owner of the Pittsburgh Steelers
- James E. Casey - Founder of UPS
- Chuck Feeney - Businessman and philanthropist who made his fortune as a co-founder of Duty Free Shoppers Group, the travel retailer of luxury products based in Hong Kong. He was the founder of the Atlantic Philanthropies, one of the largest private charitable foundations in the world.

=== Educators ===
- Mary Harris Jones – "Mother Jones", educator and labor organizer
- Joseph S. Murphy (1933–1998) – president of Queens College, president of Bennington College, and chancellor of the City University of New York
- Victoria Leigh Soto – educator who was killed in the 2012 Sandy Hook Elementary School shooting; hid students and died trying to protect them

=== Film directors, producers and scriptwriters ===
- Rafael Casal (1985–) – American writer, actor, producer, and showrunner. He is of Irish, Spanish, and Cuban descent.
- Roy E. Disney (1930–2009) – senior executive for The Walt Disney Company and son of Roy O. Disney
- Roy O. Disney (1893–1971) – Walt Disney's brother
- Walt Disney (1901–1966)
- Thom Fitzgerald – known for independent films like The Hanging Garden; born in New York; his grandparents were immigrants from County Kerry and County Cavan, Ireland
- John Ford (1894–1973) – director, best known for stylish Westerns and the film classic The Quiet Man
- Mel Gibson (1956–) – known for both writing and directing the highest grossing rated R film of all time ($370,782,930), The Passion of the Christ
- Alfred Hitchcock (1899–1980)
- John Huston (1906–1987)
- Rex Ingram (1892–1950)
- Leo McCarey (1898–1969)
- Michael Moore (1954–)
- John Sayles (1950–) – independent film director and writer, frequently takes a small part in his own and other indie films
- Mack Sennett (1880–1960)
- Quentin Tarantino (1963–)
- William Desmond Taylor (1872–1922)
- Raoul Walsh (1887–1980)
- William A. Wellman (1896–1975)
- Shannen Doherty
- Pat Powers (businessman)

=== Journalists, media ===
- Mike Barnicle
- Nellie Bly
- Jimmy Breslin
- William F. Buckley, Jr. (1925–2008)
- Howie Carr
- Ann Coulter
- John Devoy (1842–1928) – editor of the Gaelic American 1903–1928
- Phil Donahue
- Maureen Dowd
- Roger Ebert
- Jimmy Fallon
- Austin E. Ford (1857–1896) – editor of the New York Freeman
- Patrick Ford (1837–1913) – founded the Irish World in New York
- Pete Hamill
- Sean Hannity
- Greg Kelly
- Mary McGrory – Washington political reporter and columnist
- James McMaster (1820–1886) – editor of Freeman's Journal (New York)
- Chris Matthews
- John Mitchel (1815–1875) – editor of leading Confederate newspaper
- Peggy Noonan (1950– ) – author, political analyst and columnist
- Conan O'Brien
- Soledad O'Brien – journalist and producer
- Norah O'Donnell
- John Boyle O'Reilly (1844–1890) – editor of Boston Pilot
- Bill O'Reilly
- John L. O'Sullivan
- Dennis Roddy
- Mark Shields (1937–2022)
- Ed Sullivan
- Elizabeth Vargas – ABC News anchor
- Brian Williams – NBC News anchor
- Ellen DeGeneres – talk show host
- Ben Bradlee
- Ben Bradlee, Jr.
- Tom Kenny
- Billy West
- Loretta Lynn
- Dennis Quaid
- Randy Quaid
- Karen Allen
- Jim Acosta
- Mike Barnicle
- Bob Costas
- Greta Van Susteren
- Nellie Bly
- Joseph I. Breen
- Jimmy Breslin
- Howie Carr – author, Boston newspaper columnist and New England radio talk-show host; has claimed family "two-boater" Irish ancestry (i.e., Ireland-to-Canada, then Canada-to-Maine) on his father's side
- Neil Cavuto
- Carson Daly
- Phil Donahue
- Maureen Dowd
- Brian Doyle-Murray
- Roger Ebert
- Pete Hamill
- Sean Hannity
- Greg Kelly
- Megyn Kelly
- Chris Matthews
- Kayleigh McEnany
- Nick Mullen
- Bill Murray
- Joel Murray
- Peggy Noonan (1950– ) – author, political analyst and pundit for the Republican Party
- Conan O'Brien
- Soledad O'Brien
- Norah O'Donnell
- Michael O'Looney – New York-based reporter; later a business executive with Merrill Lynch
- Bill O'Reilly
- John L. O'Sullivan
- Regis Philbin
- Sally Quinn, fist anchor woman in America
- Tim Russert (1950–2008) – journalist, hosted NBC's Meet the Press from 1991 until his death in 2008
- John B. Sheridan (1870–1930) – sports journalist (Sporting News)
- Ed Sullivan
- Elizabeth Vargas
- John Walsh
- Brian Williams
- Smith Hart
- Bruce Hart
- Keith Hart
- Dean Hart
- Bret Hart
- Ross Hart
- Diana Hart
- Owen Hart
- Ireland Baldwin
- Alec Baldwin
- Daniel Baldwin
- Stephen Baldwin
- William Baldwin
- Emily Deschanel
- Nicole Sullivan
- Kevin Conroy
- Tim McGraw
- Debbie Reynolds

=== Law enforcement ===
- John O. Brennan – Director of the CIA from March 2013 to January 2017
- Raymond W. Kelly – former New York Police Commissioner
- Francis O'Neill – Chicago Police Chief
- Brian Terry – United States Border Patrol Agent, BORTAC (USBP Tactical Response Team) Operator
- Charles V. Glasco – New York City Police Sergeant who served in the New York City Police Department from June 1926 to July 1948
- Bernard Kerik – former NYPD commissioner (Irish mother)
- Buckey O'Neill
- William J. Brady
- Bat Masterson

=== Law ===
- James Duane
- William J. Brennan, Jr. – Associate Justice of the Supreme Court of the United States
- Wayne M. Collins – civil rights attorney
- James B. Comey – former United States Deputy Attorney General
- Charles Patrick Daly – Chief Justice of the New York Court of Common Pleas
- Patrick Fitzgerald – United States Attorney for the Northern District of Illinois
- Anthony Kennedy – Associate Justice of the Supreme Court of the United States
- Robert F. Kennedy – United States Attorney General
- Roger I. McDonough – Chief Justice of the Utah Supreme Court
- Dorothy Miner – chief counsel for the New York City Landmarks Preservation Commission
- Frank Murphy – Associate Justice of the Supreme Court of the United States
- Roger J. Traynor – Chief Justice of the Supreme Court of California
- James Sullivan (governor)
- George Wythe McCook
- James Clark McReynolds
- Charles Carroll (barrister)
- Brett Kavanaugh - Associate Justice of the Supreme Court of the United States
- Amy Coney Barrett - Associate Justice of the Supreme Court of the United States
- James B. Donovan - Lawyer known for hostage negotiation of 1960–1962 with the Soviet Union

=== Literature ===
- Philip Barry – playwright; author of The Philadelphia Story
- L. Frank Baum – author of The Wonderful Wizard of Oz
- Ted Berrigan – poet, part of the second generation of the New York School; author of The Sonnets
- John Berryman – poet; one of the founders of the Confessional school of poetry
- Louise Bogan – poet, translator, and critic; served as Poet Laureate of the United States 1945–1946
- T. Coraghessan Boyle – novelist and short story writer; awarded the 1988 PEN/Faulkner Award for his novel World's End
- Quinn Bradlee – author of A Different Life: Growing Up Learning Disabled
- Bill Bryson – travel writer; awarded an honorary OBE for his contribution to literature
- John Horne Burns – novelist and travel writer; author of The Gallery
- Jim Carroll – author, poet, and punk musician; author of The Basketball Diaries
- Neal Cassady – author and poet; provided the basis for the character Dean Moriarty in Jack Kerouac's novel On the Road
- Raymond Chandler – novelist and short story writer; author of the Philip Marlowe detective series that shaped the modern "private eye" story
- Mary Coyle Chase – playwright and screenwriter; awarded the 1945 Pulitzer Prize for Drama for Harvey
- Kate Chopin – novelist and short story writer; her novel The Awakening (1899) is considered a proto-feminist precursor to American modernism
- Tom Clancy – novelist; author of many bestselling novels, including The Hunt for Red October and Clear and Present Danger
- Mary Higgins Clark – bestselling author of suspense novels
- Billy Collins – poet; served two terms as Poet Laureate of the United States 2001–2003
- Joe Connelly – novelist; author of Bringing Out the Dead
- Michael Connelly – crime novelist; author of the bestselling Harry Bosch detective series
- Pat Conroy – novelist and memoirist; author of The Great Santini and The Prince of Tides
- Robert Creeley – poet and author associated with the Black Mountain poets; awarded a 2000 American Book Award Lifetime Achievement Award
- Maureen Daly – novelist and short story writer; her novel Seventeenth Summer (1942) is considered the first young adult novel
- Philip K. Dick – science fiction author
- J.P. Donleavy – novelist; author of The Ginger Man, named on the Modern Library List of Best 20th-Century Novels
- Kirby Doyle – poet and novelist; associated with the New American Poetry movement and "third generation" American modernist poets
- Alan Dugan – poet; winner of the 1961 Pulitzer Prize for Poetry for his volume Poems
- John Gregory Dunne – journalist, essayist, novelist and screenwriter; author of True Confessions
- James T. Farrell – novelist; author of the Studs Lonigan trilogy, named on the Modern Library List of Best 20th-Century Novels
- F. Scott Fitzgerald – novelist and short story writer; his novel The Great Gatsby was named on both the Modern Library List of Best 20th-Century Novels and the TIME 100 Best English-Language Novels from 1923 to 2005
- Robert Fitzgerald – poet, critic, and translator; served as Poet Laureate of the United States 1984–1985
- Thomas Flanagan – novelist and academic; winner of the 1979 National Book Critics Circle Award for The Year of the French
- Vince Flynn – political thriller novelist; author of bestselling Mitch Rapp series
- Alice Fulton – poet and short story writer; awarded the 2002 Bobbitt National Prize for Poetry for Felt
- Tess Gallagher – poet, short story writer, essayist, and playwright
- Lucy Grealy – poet, memoirist, and essayist; author of Autobiography of a Face
- Pete Hamill – journalist, columnist, novelist, and short story writer
- George V. Higgins – novelist, columnist, and academic; known for his best-selling crime novels, including The Friends of Eddie Coyle
- Amber L. Hollibaugh – writer and filmmaker
- Fanny Howe – poet, novelist, and short-story writer; awarded the 2001 Lenore Marshall Poetry Prize for Selected Poems
- Marie Howe – poet; winner of the 1987 Open Competition of the National Poetry Series for The Good Thief
- Susan Howe – poet and literary critic; awarded American Book Awards in 1981 for The Liberties and 1986 for My Emily Dickinson
- William Dean Howells – realist novelist, literary critic, and playwright, nicknamed "The Dean of American Letters"
- Brigit Pegeen Kelly – poet; finalist for the 2005 Pulitzer Prize for Poetry for The Orchard
- Myra Kelly – novelist and schoolteacher
- Robert Kelly – poet associated with the deep image group; awarded a 1980 American Book Award for In Time
- William Kennedy – novelist and author, winner of the 1983 National Book Critics Circle Award for Fiction, 1984 Pulitzer Prize for Fiction for Ironweed, and a 1984 American Book Award for O Albany!
- X. J. Kennedy – poet, translator, anthologist, editor, and children's author
- Richard Kenney – poet and academic
- Jean Kerr – author and Tony Award-winning playwright
- Galway Kinnell – poet; awarded the 1983 Pulitzer Prize for Poetry and 1983 National Book Award for Poetry for Selected Poems
- R. A. Lafferty – Hugo- and Nebula-nominated science fiction author
- Michael Lally – poet and author; awarded a 2000 American Book Award for It's Not Nostalgia: Poetry and Prose
- James Laughlin – poet and publisher; winner of the 1989 National Book Critics Circle Award Lifetime Achievement Award and the 1992 National Book Awards Medal of Distinguished Contribution to American Letters; namesake of the annual James Laughlin Award administered by the Academy of American Poets
- Dennis Lehane – novelist, author of A Drink Before the War and Mystic River
- John Logan – poet and academic; awarded the 1982 Lenore Marshall Poetry Prize for Only the Dreamer Can Change the Dream
- William Logan – poet, critic, and scholar; awarded the 2005 National Book Critics Circle Award for Criticism for The Undiscovered Country: Poetry in the Age of Tin
- Thomas Lynch – poet and essayist; awarded a 1998 American Book Award for The Undertaking: Life Studies from the Dismal Trade
- Michael Patrick MacDonald – memoirist; winner of a 2000 American Book Award for All Souls: A Family Story From Southie
- Cormac McCarthy – novelist and playwright; author of Blood Meridian and winner of the 2007 Pulitzer Prize for Fiction for The Road
- Frank McCourt – memoirist; winner of the 1996 National Book Critics Circle Award and the 1997 Pulitzer Prize for Biography or Autobiography for Angela's Ashes
- Alice McDermott – novelist; awarded the 1998 National Book Award and a 1999 American Book Award for Charming Billy
- Brian McDonough – author, physician
- Campbell McGrath – poet
- Thomas McGrath – poet; awarded a 1984 American Book Award for Echoes Inside the Labyrinth and the 1989 Lenore Marshall Poetry Prize for Selected Poems: 1938–1988
- Thomas McGuane – novelist, screenwriter, and short story writer; nominated for a National Book Award for Ninety-Two in the Shade
- Seanan McGuire – author
- Jay McInerney – novelist; author of Bright Lights, Big City
- James McMichael – poet; awarded the 1999 Arthur Rense Prize
- Terrence McNally – playwright; winner of six Tony Awards and nominated for the 1994 Pulitzer Prize for Drama for A Perfect Ganesh
- Maile Meloy – novelist and short story writer; awarded The Paris Review's 2001 Aga Khan Prize for Fiction for her story "Aqua Boulevard"
- Margaret Mitchell – novelist; awarded the 1937 Pulitzer Prize for Gone with the Wind
- Helen Curtin Moskey – poet
- Robert C. O'Brien – journalist and children's author; awarded the 1972 Newbery Medal for Mrs. Frisby and the Rats of NIMH
- Tim O'Brien – novelist and short story writer; prominent author of fiction about the Vietnam War, including The Things They Carried, a finalist for both the Pulitzer Prize and the National Book Critics Circle Award
- Edwin O'Connor – novelist, winner of the 1962 Pulitzer Prize for Fiction for The Edge of Sadness
- Flannery O'Connor – novelist and short story writer; notable author in the Southern Gothic style
- Frank O'Hara – poet, prominent member of the New York School
- John O'Hara – novelist; author of Appointment in Samarra, named one of the TIME 100 Best English-Language Novels from 1923 to 2005
- Theodore O'Hara – poet
- Charles Olson – poet and critic, associated with the second generation American Modernist poets; author of The Maximus Poems
- Eugene O'Neill – playwright; awarded the 1936 Nobel Prize for Literature and four-time winner of the Pulitzer Prize for Drama
- Tim O'Reilly - author, publisher, and founder of O'Reilly Media
- Edgar Allan Poe – writer, poet, editor, and literary critic
- J.F. Powers – novelist and short story writer; winner of the 1963 National Book Award for Morte d'Urban
- Anne Rice – horror novelist; author of bestselling Interview with a Vampire series
- Ryan Max Riley – humorist and freestyle mogul skier on the US Ski Team
- Nora Roberts – romance novelist; first inductee into the Romance Writers of America Hall of Fame
- Kay Ryan – poet and academic; currents Poet Laureate of the United States
- Michael Ryan – poet; awarded the 1990 Lenore Marshall Poetry Prize for God Hunger
- John Patrick Shanley – playwright and screenwriter; winner of the 2005 Pulitzer Prize for Drama for Doubt: A Parable
- Nicholas Sparks – author and screenwriter
- Mickey Spillane – crime novelist; author of bestselling Mike Hammer detective novels
- John Kennedy Toole – novelist; posthumously awarded the 1981 Pulitzer Prize for Fiction for A Confederacy of Dunces
- Jim Tully – novelist, playwright, best known for Beggars of Life
- Michael Walsh – novelist and screenwriter; awarded a 2004 American Book Award for And All The Saints
- Roger Zelazny – fantasy and science fiction author; winner of three Nebula Awards and six Hugo Awards

=== Military ===
- John Barry – father of the United States Navy; Irish-born
- John Brennan – Director of the Central Intelligence Agency (CIA) from 2013 to 2017.
- William J. Casey – Director of Central Intelligence (CIA) from 1981 to 1987.
- Albert Cashier, American Civil War soldier
- Michael Hayden (general) - Director of Central Intelligence Agency (CIA) and Director of NSA
- Patrick Edward Connor – Union general born in Kerry
- Michael Corcoran – United States Army general
- James Hickey – leader of Operation Red Dawn; son of Irish immigrants
- Stephen W. Kearny – US Army officer, noted for action in the southwest during the Mexican–American War
- David Conner (naval officer)
- William D. Leahy – The most senior United States military officer on active duty during World War II, he held several titles and exercised considerable influence over foreign and military policy. As a fleet admiral, he was the first flag officer ever to hold a five-star rank in the U.S. Armed Forces.
- Andrew Lewis – Continental Army general
- Alfred Thayer Mahan – naval officer and author whose work, including Sea Power, inspired the creation of the modern United States Navy
- Dennis Hart Mahan – guiding light and head of faculty at West Point for decades prior to the Civil War; influential author whose published works were the keystone for spreading engineering knowledge throughout the antebellum US; his Napoleon seminar at West Point informed Civil War strategies, North and South
- George Gordon Meade – commanding general of the Army of the Potomac who led the Union forces to victory at Gettysburg in 1863
- Thomas Francis Meagher – United States Army general, Fenian
- Richard Montgomery – Continental Army general
- Audie Murphy – most decorated combat soldier of World War II
- Lt. Michael Patrick Murphy – Navy Seal, Medal of Honor
- Timothy Murphy – marksman, Continental Army; parents were Irish immigrants
- Thomas Macdonough, Jr. 19th-century Irish-American naval officer
- Hugh McGary, 18th century Irish-American military officer, founder of McGary's station in Oregon, Kentucky
- Jeremiah O'Brien – captain in Continental Navy
- Joseph T. O'Callahan – Medal of Honor
- John O'Neill – United States Army general, Fenian
- George S. Patton – general in the United States Army who commanded the Seventh United States Army in the Mediterranean Theater of World War II, and the Third United States Army in France and Germany after the Allied invasion of Normandy in June 1944.
- John P. O'Neill – high ranking anti-terrorism expert
- Molly Pitcher – Revolutionary War heroine
- John Reynolds – general commanding the right wing of the Army of the Potomac who surprised Lee and committed the Union Army to battle at Gettysburg in July 1863; killed in the front lines while personally rallying troops for counterattacks during the first day of fighting
- Philip Sheridan – United States Army, General of the Army, Cavalry
- John Sullivan – Continental Army general
- William M. Browne
- Richard Busteed
- Joseph Finegan
- William Gamble
- James Hagan
- James Lawlor Kiernan
- Walter P. Lane
- Michael Kelly Lawler
- Patrick Theodore Moore
- James Shields
- Thomas Alfred Smyth
- Thomas William Sweeny
- James McLaughlin
- Samuel Brady - Irish American Revolutionary War officer, frontier scout and notorious Indian fighter
- James Clinton Anglo-Irish
- Stephen Moylan
- James Moore (Continental Army officer)
- Hercules Mulligan
- Thomas Hickey (soldier)
- Richard Butler (general)
- Edward Hand
- Thomas McInerney
- Thomas White (patriot)
- Simon Girty
- Charles Clinton
- Myles Keogh
- Patrick Edward Connor
- Stephen Joseph McGroarty
- Robert Nugent (officer)
- John McCausland
- Lawrence O'Bryan Branch
- Peter O'Brien (Medal of Honor)
- John Gregory Bourke
- Edmond Butler
- Henry D. O'Brien
- Out of the 115 killed at Battle of Bunker Hill 22 were Irish-born some of their names include Callaghan, Casey, Collins, Connelly, Dillon, Donohue, Flynn, McGrath, Nugent, Shannon, and Sullivan
- Robert Magaw
- John Rutledge – Anglo-Irish
- Richard Byrnes
- Bennet C. Riley
- Philip Kearny
- William Wilson Quinn – lieutenant general
- Presley O'Bannon - A first lieutenant in the United States Marine Corps, famous for his exploits in the First Barbary War (1801–1805). He was presented a sword for his part in attempting to restore Prince Hamet Karamanli to his throne as the Bey of Tripoli. That sword is the inspiration for the United States Marine Corps officer uniform since 1825.
- William J. Donovan - He is regarded as the founding father of the CIA, and a statue of him stands in the lobby of the CIA headquarters building in Langley, Virginia.
- Dennis E. Nolan - Major General who distinguished himself by heading the first modern American military combat intelligence function during World War I.
- Martin Dempsey - General and the 18th chairman of the Joint Chiefs of Staff

=== Presidents ===
At least 22 presidents of the United States have some Irish ancestral origins, although the extent of this varies. Whereas Andrew Jackson and John F. Kennedy were of wholly Irish descent, most other Presidents trace their ancestry to multiple countries, Ireland being only one of them..

Andrew Jackson (Scotch-Irish and English)
7th President 1829–37: He was born in the predominantly Ulster-Scots Waxhaws area of South Carolina two years after his parents left Boneybefore, near Carrickfergus in County Antrim. A heritage centre in the village pays tribute to the legacy of 'Old Hickory', the People's President. Andrew Jackson then moved to Tennessee, where he served as Governor.
James Knox Polk (Scotch-Irish)
11th President, 1845–49: His ancestors were among the first Ulster-Scots settlers, emigrating from Coleraine in 1680 to become a powerful political family in Mecklenburg County, North Carolina. He moved to Tennessee and became its governor before winning the presidency.
James Buchanan (Scotch-Irish and Irish)
15th President, 1857–61: Born in a log cabin (which has been relocated to his old school in Mercersburg, Pennsylvania), 'Old Buck' cherished his origins: "My Ulster blood is a priceless heritage". The Buchanans were originally from Deroran, near Omagh in County Tyrone where the ancestral home still stands. Buchanan also had pre-plantation Irish ancestry being a descendant of the O'Kanes from County Londonderry.
Andrew Johnson (Irish and English)
17th President, 1865–69: His grandfather supposedly left Mounthill, near Larne in County Antrim around 1750 and settled in North Carolina he was of English ancestry. Andrew worked there as a tailor and ran a successful business in Greeneville, Tennessee, before being elected Vice-President. He became President following Abraham Lincoln's assassination. His Mother was Mary “Polly” McDonough of Irish ancestry 1782.
Ulysses S. Grant (Possibly Irish, Scotch-Irish, English and Scottish)
18th President, 1869–77: The home of his maternal great-grandfather, John Simpson, at Dergenagh, County Tyrone, is the location for an exhibition on the eventful life of the victorious Civil War commander who served two terms as President. Grant visited his ancestral homeland in 1878. His grandmother was Rachel Kelley, the daughter of an Irish pioneer.
Chester A. Arthur (Scotch-Irish and English)
21st President, 1881–85: His election was the start of a quarter-century in which the White House was occupied by men of Ulster-Scots origins. His family left Dreen, near Cullybackey, County Antrim, in 1815. There is now an interpretive centre, alongside the Arthur Ancestral Home, devoted to his life and times.
Grover Cleveland (Irish and English)
22nd and 24th President, 1885–89 and 1893–97: Born in New Jersey, he was the maternal grandson of merchant Abner Neal, who emigrated from County Antrim in the 1790s. Stephen Grover Cleveland was born to Ann (née Neal) and Richard Falley Cleveland. Ann Neal was of Irish ancestry and Richard Falley Cleveland was of Anglo-Irish and English ancestry.
Benjamin Harrison (Scotch-Irish and English)
23rd President, 1889–93: His mother, Elizabeth Irwin, had Ulster-Scots roots through her two great-grandfathers, James Irwin and William McDowell. Harrison was born in Ohio and served as a brigadier general in the Union Army before embarking on a career in Indiana politics which led to the White House.
William McKinley (Scotch-Irish and English)
25th President, 1897–1901: Born in Ohio, the descendant of a farmer from Conagher, near Ballymoney, County Antrim, he was proud of his ancestry and addressed one of the national Scotch-Irish congresses held in the late 19th century. His second term as president was cut short by an assassin's bullet.
Theodore Roosevelt (Irish, Scotch-Irish, Dutch, Scotch, English and French)
26th President, 1901-09: Roosevelt's mother, Mittie Bulloch, had Ulster Scots ancestors who emigrated from Glenoe, County Antrim, in May 1729. Roosevelt praised "Irish Presbyterians" as "a bold and hardy race." However, he also said: "But a hyphenated American is not an American at all. This is just as true of the man who puts "native" before the hyphen as of the man who puts German or Irish or English or French before the hyphen." (Roosevelt was referring to "nativists", not American Indians, in this context)
William Howard Taft (Irish and English)
27th President, 1909–13: His great-great-great-grandfather, Robert Taft was born in 1640 in Ireland and immigrated to America, during the mid 17th century. Robert taft was from County Louth.
Woodrow Wilson (Scotch-Irish)
28th President, 1913–21: Of Ulster-Scot descent on both sides of the family, his roots were very strong and dear to him. He was the grandson of a printer from Dergalt, near Strabane, County Tyrone, whose former home is open to visitors. Throughout his career, Wilson reflected on the influence of his ancestral values on his constant quest for knowledge and fulfillment.
Warren G. Harding (Scotch-Irish and English)
29th President, 1921–23.
Harry S. Truman (Scotch-Irish and German)
33rd President, 1945–53.
John F. Kennedy (Irish)
35th President, 1961–63 (ancestors from County Wexford, County Limerick, County Cork, County Clare and County Fermanagh). The first Catholic president.
Richard Nixon (Irish, Scotch-Irish, English and German)
37th President, 1969–74: Nixon's ancestors left Ulster in the mid-18th century; the Quaker Milhous family ties were with County Antrim and County Kildare and County Cork.
Jimmy Carter (Scotch-Irish & English)
39th President, 1977–1981 (distant ancestors from County Antrim).
Ronald Reagan (Irish, English and Scottish)
40th President, 1981–89: He was the great-grandson, on his father's side, of Irish migrants from County Tipperary who came to America via Canada and England in the 1840s. His mother was of Scottish and English ancestry.
George H. W. Bush (Irish and English)
41st President, 1989–93: County Wexford historians have found that his apparent ancestor, Richard de Clare, Earl of Pembroke (known as Strongbow for his arrow skills), is remembered as a desperate, land-grabbing warlord whose calamitous foreign adventure led to the suffering of generations. Shunned by Henry II, he offered his services as a mercenary in the 12th-century invasion of Wexford in exchange for power and land. He would die from a festering ulcer in his foot, which his enemies said was the revenge of Irish saints whose shrines he had violated. The genetic line can also be traced to Dermot MacMurrough, the Gaelic king of Leinster reviled in history books as the man who sold Ireland by inviting Strongbow's invasion to save himself from a local feud.
Bill Clinton (Irish, Scotch-Irish and English)
42nd President, 1993–2001: According to a census document, Clinton's paternal great-grandmother Hattie Hayes had Irish parents and his paternal great-grandfather had an Irish father. Clinton's mother's maiden name, Cassidy, also suggests Irish ancestry on the maternal side, although there is no documentation to substantiate that claim.
George W. Bush (Irish, Scottish, Dutch, Welsh, French, German & English)
43rd President, 2001–09: One of his five times great-grandfathers, William Holliday, was born in Rathfriland, County Down, about 1755, and died in Kentucky about 1811–12. One of the President's seven times great-grandfathers, William Shannon, was born somewhere in County Cork about 1730, and died in Pennsylvania in 1784.
Barack Obama (Kenyan, English and Irish)
44th President, 2009–2017: His paternal ancestors came to America from Kenya and his maternal ancestors came to America from England. His ancestors lived in New England and the South and by the 1800s most were in the Midwest. His father was Kenyan and the first of his family to leave Africa. His great-great-grandfather, Falmouth Kearney, was born in the Irish town of Moneygall.
Joe Biden, (Irish and English)
46th President 2021-2025: His closest link to Ireland is his great-grandfather James Finnegan, who was born in County Louth in 1840.

=== Science ===
- Jim Collins – Rhodes Scholar, MacArthur genius, bioengineer and inventor
- Simon Hullihen – Known as The Father of Oral Surgery
- Charles McBurney – Medical Pioneer
- O. Timothy O'Meara – Mathematician, University of Notre Dame
- Eugene P. Kennedy - Biochemist who won the 1986 Heinrich Wieland Prize and was nominated for the 1968 Nobel Prize in Chemistry.
- Thomas J. Fogarty - Won the 2012 National Medal of Technology and Innovation. He is best known for the invention of the embolectomy catheter (or balloon catheter), which revolutionized the treatment of blood clots (embolus). He was inducted into the National Inventors Hall of Fame in 2001.
- Michael O'Keeffe (chemist) - Chemist who won the 2019 Gregori Aminoff Prize and the 2007 Newcomb Cleveland Prize.
- Bert W. O'Malley - Professor of Molecular and Cellular Biology and winner of the 2007 National Medal of Science. He is considered the 'father of molecular endocrinology' and has received numerous other awards as well, including the prestigious Louisa Gross Horwitz Prize.
- Joseph Murray - 1990 Nobel Prize-winning scientist in Physiology or Medicine
- John O'Keefe - 2014 Nobel Prize-winning scientist in Physiology or Medicine
- William C. Campbell - 2015 Nobel Prize-winning scientist in Physiology or Medicine
- James Cronin - 1980 Nobel Prize-winning scientist in Physics
- John L. Hennessy - Computer scientist who won the 2017 Turing Award for work in developing the reduced instruction set computer (RISC) architecture.
- Pat Hanrahan - Computer Scientist who won the 2019 Turing Award.
- John McCarthy (computer scientist) - Was awarded the 1971 Turing Award for his contributions to the topic of AI, the United States National Medal of Science, and the Kyoto Prize.
- Dennis Sullivan - Mathematician who was awarded the Abel Prize in 2022 and the Wolf Prize in Mathematics in 2010.
- Alan C. Newell - Mathematician who received the John von Neumann Prize in applied mathematical sciences and who made contributions to many areas of research such as pattern formation, nonlinear waves and solutions, optics, wave turbulence, plasmas and fluids and coherent structures.
- Hugh McDevitt - Immunologist and Professor of Microbiology and Immunology who was best known for his discovery of immune response genes and the first definitive physical map of the major histocompatibility complex (MHC).
- Jonathan Dowling - Professor in theoretical physics known for his work on quantum technology, particularly for exploiting quantum entanglement (in the form of a NOON state) for applications to quantum metrology, quantum sensing, and quantum imaging.
- Peter Dervan - Professor of Chemistry and winner of several awards, including the 2006 National Medal of Science, the 2022 Priestley Medal, and the 1999 Linus Pauling Award.
- William P. Murphy - 1934 Nobel Prize-winning scientist in Physiology or Medicine
- Linda B. Buck - 2004 Nobel Prize-winning scientist in Physiology or Medicine
- Thomas Christian Kavanagh - Civil engineer and educator, and a founding member of the National Academy of Engineering, serving as its first treasurer from 1964 to 1974.
- Kathleen Antonelli - Also known as Kay McNulty, was a computer programmer and one of the six original programmers of the ENIAC, one of the first general-purpose electronic digital computers.
- William James MacNeven - Physician and referred to as the "Father of American Chemistry". One of the oldest obelisks in New York City is dedicated to him near St. Paul's Chapel on Broadway.
- John Philip Holland – inventor of the submarine; Fenian
- Sean B. Carroll - Biologist who has won several awards including the Benjamin Franklin Medal in Life Science from the Franklin Institute "for proposing and demonstrating that the diversity and multiplicity of animal life is largely due to the different ways that the same genes are regulated rather than to mutation of the genes themselves."
- Margaret Murnane - Physicist who has earned multiple awards including the MacArthur Fellowship award in 2000, the Frederic Ives Medal/Quinn Prize in 2017, the highest award of The Optical Society, and the 2021 Benjamin Franklin Medal in Physics.
- John P. Hayes - Computer scientist and electrical engineer who in 2013, the IEEE Computer Society Test Technology Technical Community honored with a Lifetime Contribution Medal. In 2014, Hayes was recognized with the ACM Special Interest Group on Design Automation Pioneering Achievement Award "for his pioneering contributions to logic design, fault tolerant computing, and testing."
- Thomas Maurice Rice - Theoretical physicist specializing in condensed matter physics who won the prestigious 1998 EPS Europhysics Prize for his "original contributions to the theory of strongly correlated electron systems."
- Conor P. Delaney - Physician and medical researcher whose research contributions include various aspects of surgery, surgical cost-efficiency and surgical education, while his clinical research contributions include developing enhanced recovery pathways in minimally invasive laparoscopic colorectal surgery, carcinoma of the colon and rectum, Crohn's disease and Ulcerative colitis, sphincter-saving surgery, re-operative abdominal surgery, and colonoscopy.
- Joseph John O'Connell - Electrical engineer and inventor.
- John A. O'Keefe (astronomer) - Astronomer who is the co-discoverer of the YORP effect. NASA's Goddard Space Flight Center conferred its highest honor, the Award of Merit, on O'Keefe in 1992.
- Gerard K. O'Neill - American physicist who invented a device called the particle storage ring for high-energy physics experiments. He is well known for the idea known as an O'Neill cylinder.
- Patrick M. McCarthy (surgeon) - Professor of Surgery who invented the Myxo ETlogix ring, a heart valve repair ring.
- Betty Sullivan - Biochemist and first women to win the Osbourne Medal by the American Association of Cereal Chemists. Sullivan was also awarded the Garvan–Olin Medal in 1954 by the American Chemical Society.
- Craig Fennie - Physicist and materials scientist. He is best known for winning a MacArthur Award in 2013.
- Neville Hogan - Professor of Mechanical Engineering who received the Rufus Oldenburger Medal in 2009.
- Eamonn Healy - Irish-American professor of chemistry, organic chemistry, and biochemistry. As a member of the Dewar research group he co-authored Austin Model 1, or AM1, a semi-empirical method for the quantum calculation of molecular electronic structure in computational chemistry.
- David Madigan - Professor of Statistics with over 200 publications
- John F. McCarthy Jr. - Scientist and engineer who was awarded the NASA Distinguished Service Medal in 1982
- Garret A. FitzGerald - Medical researcher who has won several awards including the 2013 Schottenstein Prize, Lefoulon-Delalande Prize, Scheele Award, the Lucian Award as well as the 2009 Taylor Prize. His work contributed substantially to the development of low-dose aspirin to prevent heart attacks and stroke.
- Morrough Parker O'Brien - Hydraulic engineering professor and is considered the founder of modern coastal engineering. He is known for the MOJS equation, an equation used to estimate the wave loads in the design of oil platforms and other offshore structures. He also worked in the aerospace division of General Electric and was elected to their Propulsion Hall of Fame in 1984.
- Katherine A. Fitzgerald - Irish-American Molecular biologist and virologist
- John Benjamin Murphy - Physician and abdominal surgeon. Several medical terms are named after him including: Murphy's button, Murphy drip, Murphy’s punch, Murphy’s test, and Murphy-Lane bone skid. The Mayo Clinic co-founder William James Mayo called him "the surgical genius of our generation".
- John McCarthy (mathematician) - Mathematician who won the Gilbert de Beauregard Robinson award in 2016.
- Michael J. Flynn - Electrical Engineer who won the Computer Pioneer Award
- Michael O'Shaughnessy - Civil Engineer for which O'Shaughnessy Dam (California) is named after.
- Joseph Francis Shea - Aerospace engineer and NASA manager. He worked on the radio inertial guidance system of the Titan I intercontinental ballistic missile
- Paul C. Donnelly - Guided missile pioneer and a senior NASA manager during the Apollo Moon landing program. He was awarded the NASA Distinguished Service Medal.
- Patrick Bernard Delany - Electrician and Inventor. Newspaper feature coverage in 1909 called him "the world's greatest telegraph expert and inventor." Delany was a two-time recipient of the Elliott Cresson Medal awarded by the Franklin Institute, one in 1886 for "Synchronous Telegraphy" and another in 1896 for "Telegraphy, High speed system".
- Patrick G. O'Shea - Physicist who served as chief research officer at the University of Maryland. He also is a Fellow of the American Physical Society, the Institute of Electrical and Electronics Engineers and the American Association for the Advancement of Science.
- Edward Condon - Physicist and pioneer in quantum mechanics. The Franck–Condon principle and the Slater–Condon rules are co-named after him. He participated in the development of radar during world war II and was awarded the Frederic Ives Medal by the Optical Society in 1968.
- Brian O'Brien (optical physicist) - Physicist who received numerous awards, including the Medal for Merit, the nation's highest civilian award, for his work on optics in World War II and the Frederic Ives Medal in 1951.
- Patrick O'Neil - Computer Scientist
- Denton Cooley - American cardiothoracic surgeon famous for performing the first implantation of a total artificial heart. He was one of the most-renowned heart surgeons in the world.
- Randall C. O'Reilly - Professor of Psychology and Computer Science. He is most famous for developing the Leabra recirculating algorithm for learning in neural networks.
- Charles P. O'Brien - Medical research scientist and a leading expert in the science and treatment of addiction.
- Eugenius Nulty - Mathematician whose work Elements of Geometry, theoretical and practical was one of the first two or three original geometries published in the United States.
- James D. Griffin (oncologist) - Professor of Medicine at Harvard Medical School, an expert in medical oncology and is widely recognized for his research in the clinical and biologic aspects of hemotologic malignancies.
- F. A. Murphy - Medical Researcher. He was a member of the team of scientists that discovered the Ebola virus at the Centers for Disease Control and Prevention (CDC) and is internationally known for his work on rabies, encephalitis and hemorrhagic fevers, with over 250 peer-reviewed journal articles.

=== Sports ===
- Muhammad Ali – former professional boxer
- Danny Amendola – former NFL player
- Lance Armstrong – professional road racing cyclist
- Micah Ashby – mixed martial artist
- Finn Bálor – professional wrestler
- Larry Bird - former NBA player
- Cal Bowdler – former basketball player
- Brian Boyle – former NHL player
- James J. Braddock – professional boxer
- Tom Brady – former NFL player, Tampa Bay Buccaneers quarterback
- Joseph "Joe" Brennan – Basketball Hall of Famer
- Courtney Brosnan, soccer player, international for Ireland
- Phillip Brooks (CM Punk) – WWE wrestler
- Tom Cahill – former MLB baseball player
- Ryan Callahan – former NHL player
- Kyra Carusa – soccer player, international for Ireland
- Chris Coghlan – MLB baseball player
- Marty Conlon – former basketball player
- Billy Conn – professional boxer
- Dan Connolly – former NFL player
- George Connor – NFL player, Chicago Bears
- Gerry Cooney – professional boxer
- James J. Corbett – professional boxer
- Charlie Coyle – NHL player, Boston Bruins
- Matt Cullen – former NHL player
- John Daly – professional golfer
- Clint Dempsey – former professional soccer player
- Jack Dempsey – former professional boxer
- Landon Donovan – former professional soccer player
- Pat Duff – MLB professional baseball player
- Mike Dunleavy Sr. – basketball coach
- Mike Dunleavy Jr. – professional basketball player
- Patrick Eaves – former NHL player
- Julian Edelman – NFL player, New England Patriots
- John Elway – NFL player, Denver Broncos quarterback
- Dave Finlay – former professional wrestler
- Mick Foley - professional wrestler
- Whitey Ford – MLB player, New York Yankees pitcher
- Mike Gibbons – professional boxer
- Tommy Gibbons – professional boxer
- Mike Hall – professional basketball player
- Noah Hanifin – NHL player, Vegas Golden Knights
- Luke Harangody – professional basketball player
- Jeff Hardy – WWE wrestler
- Matt Hardy – WWE wrestler
- Tom Harmon - American football – former NFL player
- Ben Hogan – professional golfer
- Holly Holm – MMA fighter
- Derek Jeter – MLB player, New York Yankees shortstop
- Patrick Kane – NHL player, Detroit Red Wings
- Jason Kidd – NBA player/coach
- Joe Lapira – soccer player, had 1 cap for Ireland
- Jay Larranaga – basketball coach
- Jim Larranaga – basketball coach
- Katie Ledecky – Olympic swimmer
- Tommy Loughran – professional boxer
- Becky Lynch – WWE wrestler
- Christian McCaffrey - NFL player, San Francisco 49ers
- Brian McCann – MLB player, catcher for the Houston Astros
- JD McDonagh – professional wrestler
- John McEnroe – professional tennis player
- Donnie McGrath – professional basketball player
- Terry McGovern – professional boxer
- Kevin McHale – NBA player
- Larry Miggins – MLB player, St. Louis Cardinals outfielder
- Shannon Moore – TNA wrestler
- Chris Mullin - former NBA player
- Charles "Stretch"Murphy – late Basketball Hall of Famer
- Connor Murphy – NHL player, Chicago Blackhawks
- Troy Murphy – basketball player
- Larry O'Bannon – basketball player
- Philadelphia Jack O'Brien – professional boxer
- Patrick O'Bryant – basketball player
- Mike O'Dowd – professional boxer
- Kelley O'Hara – soccer player
- Ian O'Leary – professional basketball player
- Troy O'Leary – MLB player, Boston Red Sox outfielder
- Sean O'Malley - UFC fighter
- Heather O'Reilly – soccer player
- Ted Potter Jr. – professional golfer
- Jonathan Quick – NHL player, New York Rangers
- Bob Quinn – current general manager of the Detroit Lions
- Dan Quinn – NFL head coach of the Atlanta Falcons
- John Quinlan – pro wrestler
- Giovanni Reyna – soccer player
- Ryan Max Riley – skier, US Ski Team
- Freddie Roach – former boxer, current boxing trainer
- Aaron Rodgers – NFL player, Green Bay Packers
- Kevin Rooney – NHL player, Calgary Flames
- Seth Rollins – professional wrestler
- Ken Shamrock - professional wrestler and retired mixed martial artist
- Ryan Shannon – former NHL player, won the Stanley Cup with Anaheim in 2007
- Sheamus – professional wrestler
- Kelly Slater – professional surfer
- Sam Snead – PGA Golf Hall of Famer
- Erik Spoelstra – NBA head coach (Dutch-Irish American father)
- Giancarlo Stanton – MLB player, Miami Marlins outfielder
- John L. Sullivan – professional boxer, first Heavyweight champion of gloved boxing
- Gene Tunney – professional boxer
- Lyra Valkyria – professional wrestler
- Mickey Walker – professional boxer
- Andre Ward – professional boxer
- Mickey Ward – professional boxer
- Lenny Wilkens – professional basketball player
- Derrick Williams Soccer player For Atlanta United FC

=== Others ===
- Delphine LaLaurie - Serial killer
- Jim Jones - Cult leader and mass murderer
- Billy the Kid – gunslinger
- George Croghan
- Joe Rogan - podcast host and UFC commentator
- Thomas Fitzpatrick (trapper) – a.k.a. Thomas Fitzpatrick broken hand.
- John Kinney (outlaw) - outlaw
- Lawrence Murphy
- Bill Doolin - outlaw
- Hugh Glass - frontiersman and fur trapper
- John Daly (outlaw) - outlaw
- Hopalong Cassidy
- Tom O'Day
- Sir William Johnson, 1st Baronet
- George Shannon (explorer)
- Joseph Breen – Production Code director
- Frank E. Butler – marksman
- The "Unsinkable" Molly Brown – born Molly Tobin; Irish-born father
- R. Nicholas Burns – American diplomat, Harvard professor, columnist and lecturer; 19th Undersecretary of State for Political Affairs; 17th United States Permanent Representative to NATO; United States Ambassador to Greece 1997–2001
- John Chambers (1922–2001) – Academy Award-winning makeup artist
- Cheiro – astrologer
- Eileen Collins – first female commander of a Space Shuttle
- Éamon de Valera – third president of Ireland
- John Dunlap – printer, printed the first copies of the Declaration of Independence
- Wyatt Earp – lawman
- Nick Fuentes – political commentator
- Henry Louis Gates – professor at Harvard University
- Cedric Gibbons – art director
- Ann Glover – hanged as a witch in Boston
- Dan Harrington – world poker champion
- James Healy – Bishop of Portland, America's first African-American bishop; born a slave according to the laws of Georgia to an Irish immigrant and his beloved African wife; first graduate and valedictorian of the College of the Holy Cross in Massachusetts
- Michael Healy – Captain of the Revenue Cutter Bear; defender of Alaska's Native Americans; inspiration for Jack London's The Sea Wolf; prominent figure in James Michener's Alaska; younger brother of James and Patrick Healy
- Patrick Healy – President of Georgetown University, considered its second founder; brother of James Healy; first African-American president of an American university; Priest in the Society of Jesus (the Jesuits)
- James Hoban – Architect of the White House in Washington, DC
- Mary Jemison – frontierswoman
- Bat Masterson – lawman
- Jacqueline Kennedy Onassis – former First Lady; her mother, Janet Lee Bouvier, was of mostly Irish descent
- Margaret McCarthy – migrant
- Marguerite Moore – orator, patriot, activist
- Paul Charles Morphy – chess player
- Coco Rocha – Canadian model of Irish, Welsh, and Russian descent
- Ellen Ewing Sherman – stepsister and wife of William Tecumseh Sherman. Because they would have needed to buy a slave to help with the children, Mrs. Sherman refused to accompany her husband to command at the Louisiana military academy, which later became LSU. During the Civil War, she and their children took up residence at Notre Dame University, with which her family was closely affiliated.
- David Steele – Presbyterian minister
- John L. Sullivan – last bare-knuckle boxing heavyweight champion of the world; first gloved heavyweight champion of the world; first American athlete to become a national celebrity and to earn over $1 million
- Andrew Anglin – Neo-Nazi, founder, and proprietor of The Daily Stormer; a white supremacist, anti-Semitic news and commentary website.
- Kathleen Willey – major figure in the Paula Jones and Monica Lewinsky scandals involving President Bill Clinton; mother is of Irish descent
- Vince McMahon – professional wrestling promoter and executive American football executive Businessman (paternal grandmother is Irish descent)
- Dana White – American businessman and current president of the Ultimate Fighting Championship (UFC)
- Helen Thorpe – journalist, former First Lady of Colorado and Denver
