= Görling–Levy perturbation theory =

Quantum-mechanical framework for simulating molecules and solids

Görling–Levy perturbation theory (GLPT) in Kohn–Sham (KS) density functional theory (DFT) is the analogue to what Møller–Plesset perturbation theory (MPPT) is in Hartree–Fock (HF) theory. Its basis is Rayleigh–Schrödinger perturbation theory (RSPT) and the adiabatic connection (AC). It describes electronic correlation effects. It is mostly used to second (GL2), rarely to third (GL3) or fourth (GL4) order, but becomes fast really increasingly computational expensive. It was published in 1993 and 1994 by Andreas Görling and Mel Levy.

== Kohn–Sham correlation energy from Görling–Levy perturbation ==
The basis of GL perturbation theory is the adiabatic connection (AC) with the coupling constant $0\leq\alpha\leq 1$ connecting the artificial Kohn–Sham (KS) system of noninteracting electrons $\alpha=0$ to the real system of interacting electrons $\alpha=1$ with the AC Hamiltonian

$$\hat{H}_{\alpha}=\hat{T}+\alpha\hat{V}_{\text{ee}}+\sum_{i=1}^{N}v_{\alpha}(r_{i})$$

where $N$ is the number of electrons, $\hat{T}=-\frac{1}{2}\sum_{i}\nabla_{i}^{2}$ the kinetic energy of the electrons, $\hat{V}_{\text{ee}}=\sum_{i}\sum_{j>i}|r_{i}-r_{j}|^{-1}$ the electron-electron interaction. Görling and Levy expressed the coupling-strength dependent local multiplicative potential under the constraint, that the density $n(r)$ stays fixed along the AC as

$$v_{\alpha}[n](r)=v_{S}[n](r)-\alpha v_{Hx}[n](r)-v_{c}^{\alpha}[n](r)$$

where $v_{S}$ is the KS potential, $v_{Hx}$ the Hartree-exchange potential in first order, and the correlation potential for second order or higher $v_{c}^{\alpha}(r)=\alpha^{2}v_{c}^{(2)}+\alpha^{3}v_{c}^{(3)}+\alpha^{4}v_{c}^{(4)}+...$. As usual in perturbation theory we can express the correlation energy in a power series $E_{c}^{(0)}+\alpha E_{c}^{(1)}+\alpha^{2}E_{c}^{(2)}+...$, where in GLPT the zeroth and first contribution vanish i.e. $E_{c}^{(0)}=E_{c}^{(1)}=0$. The second term is the Görling–Levy second order (GL2) correlation energy and can be evaluated with using the Slater–Condon rules and Brillouin's theorem in terms of occupied $i,j$ and unoccupied $a,b$ KS orbitals and eigenvalues

$E_{c}^{\text{GL2}}[n]=\sum_{k\neq 0}^{\infty}\frac{|\langle\Phi_{S}|\hat{V}_{\text{ee}}-\sum_{i=1}^{N}v_{Hx}(r_{i})|\Phi_{k}\rangle|^{2}}{E_{0}-E_{k}}=\underbrace{\frac{1}{4}\sum_{ijab}\frac{|\langle ij||ab\rangle|^{2}}{\varepsilon_{i}+\varepsilon_{j}-\varepsilon_{a}-\varepsilon_{b}}}_{E_{c}^{\text{MP2}}[\Phi_{ij}^{ab}]}+\underbrace{\sum_{ia}\frac{|\langle i|\hat{v}_{x}^{\text{NL}}-\hat{v}_{x}|a\rangle|^{2}}{\varepsilon_{i}-\varepsilon_{a}}}_{E_{c}^{S}[\Phi_{i}^{a}]}$	1

where $\Phi_{S},\Phi_{k}$ are ground state and excited KS determinants with their respective $E_{0},E_{k}$ energies and $E_{c}^{\text{MP2}}$ is exactly the second order Møller–Plesset (MP2) correlation energy but evaluated with KS orbitals, $E_{c}^{S}$ the so called single excitation contribution to correlation which is missing in regular MPPT, but present in GLPT and $\hat{v}_{x}^{\text{NL}}$ is the nonlocal exchange operator from Hartree–Fock (HF) theory, $\hat{v}_{x}$ is the local Kohn–Sham (KS) exchange operator both evaluated with KS orbitals and lastly the notation $\langle ij||ab\rangle=\langle ij|ab\rangle-\langle ij|ba\rangle$.

== Hohenberg–Kohn functional from infinite Görling–Levy expansion ==
With GLPT up to infinite order one could in principle obtain the Hohenberg-Kohn (HK) functional exactly $F_{\text{HK}}[n]\equiv E[n]-\int drv(r)n(r)$ in terms of unoccupied and occupied KS orbitals $\{\varphi_{i}\}$ and their eigenvalues $\{\varepsilon_{i}\}$, where $E[n]$ is the electronic ground state energy and $v(r)$ the external potential. This is obviously only conceptually interesting since it is computational impossible. With the coupling constant expression

$F_{\text{HK}}[n](\alpha)=\sum_{j=0}^{\infty}\alpha^{j}E_{j}[\{\varphi_{i}\},\{\varepsilon_{i}\},\{v_{1}(r),v_{2}(r),...,v_{j-1}(r)\}]=T_{S}[n]+\alpha E_{Hx}[n]+\underbrace{\sum_{j=2}^{\infty}\alpha^{j}E_{j}}_{E_{c}^{\alpha}[n]}$	2

By setting $\alpha=1$ hence

$F_{\text{HK}}[n]=\sum_{j=0}^{\infty}E_{j}[\{\varphi_{i}\},\{\varepsilon_{i}\},\{v_{1}(r),v_{2}(r),...,v_{j-1}(r)\}]=T_{S}[n]+E_{Hx}[n]+\underbrace{\sum_{j=2}^{\infty}E_{j}}_{E_{c}[n]}$	3

where in zeroth order $E_{0}=T_{S}=\langle\Phi_{S}|\hat{T}|\Phi_{S}\rangle=\sum_{i}\int dr\phi_{i}^{*}(r)(-1/2\nabla^{2})\phi_{i}(r)$ is the KS kinetic energy with the KS potential $v_{0}(r)=v_{S}(r)$ and in first order $E_{1}=\langle\Phi_{S}|\hat{V}_{\text{ee}}|\Phi_{S}\rangle=E_{Hx}[n]$ the Hartree-exchange (Hx) energy and its respective Hx potential $v_{1}(r)=v_{Hx}(r)$ and from second order the infinite GL$n$ correlation (c) energy with $n\rightarrow\infty$, which is the exact Kohn–Sham (KS) correlation energy $\lim_{n\rightarrow\infty}\sum_{j=2}^{n}E_{c}^{\text{GLn}}[n]=\sum_{j=2}^{\infty}E_{j}=E_{c}[n]$ and the corresponding correlation potential $v_{c}(r)=\sum_{j=2}^{\infty}v_{j}(r)$. Similarly, if one would do Møller–Plesset perturbation theory up to infinite order one would obtain the exact Hartree–Fock (HF) correlation energy $\lim_{n\rightarrow\infty}\sum_{j=2}^{n}E_{c}^{\text{MPn}}=E_{c}^{\text{HF}}[\{\Phi^{\text{HF}},\Phi_{i}^{a},\Phi_{ij}^{ab},\Phi_{ijk}^{abc},...\}]$ where $i,j,k$ denote occupied and $a,b,c$ unoccupied HF orbitals and their respective singly, doubly, triply and so on excited Slater determinants. In this notation $\Phi^{\text{HF}}$ is the HF determinant and $\Phi_{S}$ the KS determinant.

=== Optimized Effective Potential (OEP) method ===
In the later half of their article Görling and Levy connect their perturbation theory to the optimized effective potential method.
