= Moskey =

Moskey is a surname. Notable people with the surname include:

- Helen Curtin Moskey (1931–2003), Irish-American poet
- Stephen T. Moskey (fl. 1972), American author and editor
