= Entropy network =

Entropy networks have been investigated in many research areas, on the assumption that entropy can be measured in a network. The embodiment of the network is often physical or informational. An entropy network is composed of entropy containers which are often called nodes, elements, features, or regions and entropy transfer occurs between containers. The transfer of entropy in networks was characterized by Schreiber in his transfer entropy.

== Physical basis ==
A discrete physical basis for entropy networks can be found in the observation, and discussions of discrete observations appear briefly in the work of Prokopenko, Lizier & Price. More complete discussions of observations were offered by Leo Szilárd and Léon Brillouin.

== Structures and motifs ==
Network motifs have been proposed to be scale independent. Networks have been classified by total entropy. The entropy content of graphs has been considered throughout fields of math and computer science. Design of entropy networks and in depth investigation has been publicized by Wissner-Gross and Freer who have proposed a time entropy relation (where entropy is maximized of a lifespan) through which predictions of the emergence of complexity can be shown.

== Domains of study ==
The role of entropy networks in formation of structures is critical in engineering and its physical implications determine chirality, organize biological molecules, and quantify the topologies of condensed matter (mass) networks.
