= Little Miss Smiles =

1922 film directed by John Ford

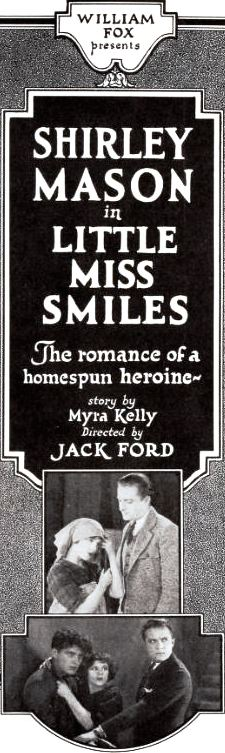
- Advertisement
- Directed by: John Ford
- Written by: John Stone; Dorothy Yost
- Based on: Little Aliens by Myra Kelly
- Produced by: William Fox
- Starring: Shirley Mason; Gaston Glass
- Cinematography: David Abel
- Distributed by: Fox Film Corporation
- Release date: January 15, 1922
- Running time: 50 minutes
- Country: United States
- Language: Silent (English intertitles)

Little Miss Smiles is a 1922 American drama film directed by John Ford. The film is considered to be lost.

== Plot ==
As described in a film magazine, The Jewish Aaronson family consists of Papa, Mama, David, Louis, Leon, Esther, and the Baby. They live in humble quarters in the ghetto of a large city. Esther spreads sunshine with her smiles and, when Mama is stricken blind and taken to the hospital, she assumes the duties as head of the family. Doctor Jack Washton at the hospital takes an interest in Esther and saves her from The Spider when he invades the Aaronson flat. On the day Mama is brought home, David is arrested for shooting The Spider. The doctor, in order to shield Esther's mother from the pain of seeing her boy arrested, assumes the blame for the shooting. The Spider, however, recovers and absolves David from all blame.

== Cast ==
- Shirley Mason as Esther Aaronson
- Gaston Glass as Dr. Jack Washton
- George B. Williams as Papa Aaronson (credited as George Williams)
- Martha Franklin as Mama Aaronson
- Arthur Rankin as Davie Aaronson
- Alfred Testa as Louis Aaronson
- Richard Lapan as Leon Aaronson
- Sidney D'Albrook as 'The Spider'
- Baby Blumfield as Baby Aaronson

== See also ==
- List of lost films
