= Micah Ashby =

American-Irish professional wrestler and mixed martial artist

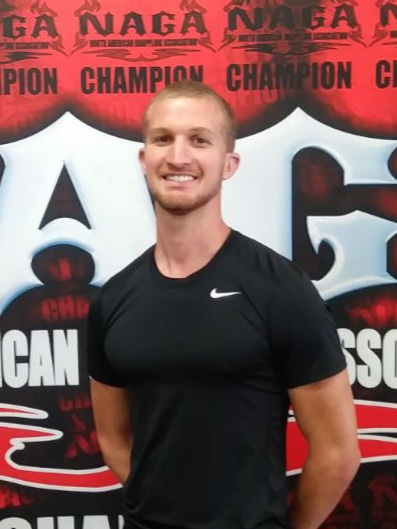
- Ashby in 2018

Personal information
- Born: Micah Nolan Ashby; April 18, 1992 (age 34) Dallas, Texas, U.S.

Professional wrestling career
- Ring name: Magic
- Billed height: 6 ft 1 in (1.85 m)
- Debut: 2010-2019; 2024-2026

Micah Ashby (born April 18, 1992) is an American-Irish retired mixed martial artist, kickboxer, professional wrestler, submission grappler and commentator.

Best known for his tenure in MMA, Ashby became the first person in combat sports to win a title in striking, grappling, mixed martial arts and professional wrestling.

During is martial arts career, Ashby was seen as a highlight fighter in Texas due to quick submission finishes and typically selling out fight cards. In addition, he would win championships in MMA, BJJ and Professional Wrestling.

He was inducted into the United States Martial Arts Hall of Fame and the International Martial Arts Hall of Fame in 2022 and 2023 respectively. Due to his successful martial arts career, Micah Ashby would be awarded the 2023 Legend's Award by the American Martial Arts Alliance.

== Life and career ==
Ashby was born in Dallas, Texas. He is of mixed African-American and Irish descent. He would begin his career as a professional wrestler in 2010 and would continue until the following year. In 2012, he would start fighting in mixed martial arts, winning the United States Open Challenge Title in December. He would also carry the title until 2014. Ashby would compete in NAGA and other grappling promotions throughout his career. After injuries in MMA, he would return to professional wrestling in 2018 and won the World Tag Team title in UGT Wrestling the following year before retiring from all martial arts in 2019.

In August 2024, Micah Ashby was awarded the Presidential Lifetime Achievement Award by President Joe Biden and is the youngest recipient of the award at age 32. In 2024, Ashby would return to martial arts, announcing his participation in the 2025 World Martial Arts Games.
