= Stephen T. Moskey =

American historian

- Education: Georgetown University
- Occupations: Historian, author, editor
- Writing career
- Pen name: Skip Moskey
- Period: Gilded Age
- Genres: non-fiction, biography
- Notable works: Larz and Isabel Anderson: Wealth and Celebrity in the Gilded Age (2016)

Stephen T. Moskey is an American author and editor specializing in scholarly works on cultural history and American biography. He has occasionally published under the name Skip Moskey.

He attended Georgetown University (BS 1972; MS 1975; PhD 1978). Early in his career, he taught as an adjunct instructor at Northern Virginia Community College, University of Saint Joseph (Connecticut), Trinity College (Connecticut), and University of Hartford. His principal career from 1978 to 2010 was in scholarly publishing, corporate communications, and public affairs. From 1987 until 1996, he served as the coordinator of HIV/AIDS policy and programs for Aetna Life & Casualty (now Aetna, Inc.) in Hartford, Connecticut. From 1988 to 1994 he served on the board of directors of the National Leadership Coalition on AIDS and was chair of its program committee for four of those years.

In 2010 he retired from corporate communications and public affairs work to pursue a new career as an independent researcher, writer, and editor focusing on American cultural and social history between 1865 and 1950. He has written social histories of the Edward Everett Hamlin House (now the Embassy of Turkey, Washington, D.C.) designed by George Oakley Totten Jr.; the Larz Anderson House designed by Arthur Little and Herbert W.C. Browne of Boston; and "Weld" (Anderson Estate), the former summer home of Larz and Isabel Anderson in Brookline, Massachusetts, designed by Edmund M. Wheelwright, with later additions by Little and Browne. He has given lectures on Larz and Isabel Anderson in Washington, DC; Brookline, MA; Paris, France; and Brussels, Belgium.

His published books are: Semantic Structures and Relations in Dutch: An Introduction to Case Grammar (Georgetown University Press, 1979); Domestic Violence in the Workplace: A Checklist for Employers and Unions (Kettle Cove Press, 1996); The Workplace Responds to Domestic Violence – A Resource Guide for Employers, Unions, and Advocates (co-authored with Donna Norton and Elizabeth Bernstein, Family Violence Prevention Fund, 1998); The Turkish Ambassador's Residence and the Cultural History of Washington, DC (co-authored with Caroline Mesrobian Hickman and John Edward Hasse, Istanbul Kültür University Press, 2013); and Larz and Isabel Anderson: Wealth and Celebrity in the Gilded Age (iUniverse 2016).

From 2012 to 2013 he served as a historical research consultant to the Town of Brookline, Massachusetts and conducted research into the historical and cultural significance of the Larz Anderson Park, the former estate (1899–1948) of Larz Anderson III and Isabel Weld Perkins, in Brookline. His findings, along with plans for an interpretive walking tour of the Park, were presented as a resource manual: Reinterpreting Larz Anderson Park: A Docent Manual and Historical Research Guide (Town of Brookline, Department of Parks and Open Space, 2013). In 2016, he was a member of an international research team that worked to reconstruct the early history of the American Hospital of Paris using archival materials from the U.S. and France.

His mother was the Irish-American poet Helen Curtin Moskey.
