= Mel Levy =

American physicist

Mel Philip Levy (born 1941) is an American physicist, working on the mathematical foundations of condensed matter theory.

He is best known for his work on Density Functional theory, specifically the constrained search approach, which generalizes the Hohenberg Kohn theorem to degenerate ground states. He also introduced Görling-Levy perturbation theory. Levy became a Fellow of the American Physical Society in 1995, and is also a member of the International Association of Quantum Molecular Science.

== Career ==
Mel Levy obtained his PhD at Indiana State University, then carried out post-doctoral fellowships at Johns Hopkins and the Technical University of Munich.

Levy worked as faculty in the Physics Department of Tulane University from 1976 to 2002, then at North Carolina A&T State University until 2007. Since 2007 he has worked at Duke University where he is now emeritus professor.
