= Acoustoelastography =

- Based on: Ultrasound

Acoustoelastography is an ultrasound technique that relates ultrasonic wave amplitude changes to a tendon's mechanical properties.

See also the page on the acoustoelastic effect.
