= Léon Brillouin =

French physicist (1889–1969)

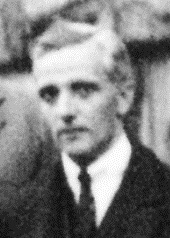
- Léon Nicolas Brillouin (1889–1969)
- Born: August 7, 1889; Sèvres, Seine-et-Oise, France
- Died: October 4, 1969 (aged 80); New York City, US
- Citizenship: French (pre-1949); American (post-1949)
- Education: École Normale Supérieure; Sorbonne; Collège de France
- Known for: Brillouin function Brillouin limit Brillouin paradox Brillouin scattering Brillouin zone Brillouin theorem Brillouin doublet Brillouin flow Brillouin–Wigner formula Einstein–Brillouin–Keller method WKB approximation Acoustoelastic effect Negentropy
- Spouse(s): Stéphanie "Stéfa" Prussak (m. 1912 d. 1966), Marcelle van Praag (m. 1967)
- Father: Marcel Brillouin
- Awards: National Academy of Sciences Membership (1953); Peccot Lectures (1919-1920); ICM Speaker (1920)
- Scientific career
- Fields: Physics
- Workplaces: Sorbonne; Collège de France; École Supérieure d'Électricité; University of Wisconsin–Madison; Brown University; Harvard; IBM; Columbia University
- Thesis: La théorie des solides et les quanta (1921)
- Doctoral advisor: Paul Langevin
- Doctoral students: Nicolas Cabrera, Ivar Stakgold

Notes
- He was the son of the physicist Marcel Brillouin.

Léon Nicolas Brillouin (French: [leɔ̃ nikɔla bʁijwɛ̃]; August 7, 1889 – October 4, 1969) was a French physicist. He made contributions to quantum mechanics, radio wave propagation in the atmosphere, solid-state physics, and information theory.

== Early life ==
Brillouin was born in Sèvres, near Paris, France. His father, Marcel Brillouin, grandfather, Éleuthère Mascart, and great-grandfather, Charles Briot, were physicists as well.

== Education ==
From 1908 to 1912, Brillouin studied physics at the École Normale Supérieure, in Paris. From 1911 he studied under Jean Perrin until he left for the Ludwig-Maximilians-Universität München (LMU), in 1912. At LMU, he studied theoretical physics with Arnold Sommerfeld. Just a few months before Brillouin's arrival at LMU, Max von Laue had conducted his experiment showing X-ray diffraction in a crystal lattice. In 1913, he went back to France to study at the University of Paris and it was in this year that Niels Bohr submitted his first paper on the Bohr model of the hydrogen atom. From 1914 until 1919, during World War I, he served in the military, developing the valve amplifier with G. A. Beauvais. At the conclusion of the war, he returned to the University of Paris to continue his studies with Paul Langevin, and was awarded his Docteur ès science in 1920. Brillouin's thesis jury was composed of Langevin, Marie Curie, and Jean Perrin and his thesis topic was on the quantum theory of solids. In his thesis, he proposed an equation of state based on the atomic vibrations (phonons) that propagate through it. He also studied the propagation of monochromatic light waves and their interaction with acoustic waves, i.e., scattering of light with a frequency change, which became known as Brillouin scattering.

== Career ==
After receipt of his doctorate, Brillouin became the scientific secretary of the reorganized Journal de Physique et le Radium. In 1932, he became associate director of the physics laboratories at the Collège de France. In 1926, Gregor Wentzel, Hendrik Kramers, and Brillouin independently developed what is known as the Wentzel–Kramers–Brillouin approximation, also known as the WKB method, classical approach, and phase integral method. In 1928, after the Institut Henri Poincaré was established, he was appointed as professor to the Chair for Theoretical Physics. During his work on the propagation of electron waves in a crystal lattice, he introduced the concept of Brillouin zones in 1930. Quantum mechanical perturbations techniques by Brillouin and by Eugene Wigner resulted in what is known as the Brillouin–Wigner formula.

Since Brillouin's study with Sommerfeld, he was interested and did pioneering work in the diffraction of electromagnetic radiation in a dispersive media. As a specialist in radio wave propagation, Brillouin was appointed director general of the French state-run agency, Radiodiffusion Nationale about a month before war with Germany, August 1939. In May 1940, upon the collapse of France, as part of the government, he retired to Vichy. Six months later, he resigned and went to the United States.

Until 1942, Brillouin was a visiting professor at the University of Wisconsin–Madison, and then he was a professor at Brown University, in Providence, Rhode Island, until 1943. For the next two years, he was a research scientist with the National Defense Research Committee at Columbia University, working in the field of radar. From 1947 to 1949, he was professor of applied mathematics at Harvard University. During the period 1952 to 1954, he was with IBM Corporation in Poughkeepsie, New York, as well as a staff member of the IBM Watson Laboratory at Columbia University. In 1954, he became an adjunct professor at Columbia University. From 1957, he was founding editor of Information and Control, and served as one of its three, later four editors until 1966. He lived in New York City until he died in 1969. His wife Marcelle died in 1986.

Brillouin was a founder of modern solid state physics for which he discovered, among other things, Brillouin zones. He applied information theory to physics and the design of computers and coined the term negentropy, shortening Schrödinger's phrase negative entropy, and used the concept to demonstrate the formal similarity between thermodynamic entropy and information.

Brillouin offered a solution to the problem of Maxwell's demon. In his book, Relativity Reexamined, he called for a "painful and complete re-appraisal" of relativity theory which "is now absolutely necessary."

== Personal life ==
Léon Brillouin married Stéphanie "Stéfa" Prussak in 1912 in Paris, France. Stéfa Prussak was born 17 December 1890 in Lodz, Poland and was a painter and avid collector of art. They had one daughter, Isabelle "Bella" Brillouin, who later married Gilbert Boris. Stéfa died in Paris on March 17, 1966 after an illness. Léon Brillouin remarried a few years later to a friend of his first wife, Marcelle van Praag (born Marcelle Esther Lioni), and were together until his death on October 4, 1969 (Note: Names and dates from marriage and death certificates found in Box 17 Folders 1-8, Papers of Léon Brillouin, 1877-1972, Niels Bohr Library & Archives, American Institute of Physics, College Park, MD, 20740.). His widow Marcelle (known as Madame Brillouin), and his daughter from his first marriage, Bella, managed his estate and gifted his archival papers and papers related to his father and grandfather to the AIP Niels Bohr Library & Archives in 1970.

== Contributions ==
- Brillouin function
- Brillouin limit
- Brillouin scattering
- Brillouin zone
- Brillouin theorem
- Brillouin doublet
- Brillouin flow
- Brillouin–Wigner formula
- Einstein–Brillouin–Keller method
- WKB approximation
- Acoustoelastic effect
- Negentropy

== Honors ==
- 1953 – Elected to the US National Academy of Sciences

== Books ==
- Les mesures en haute fréquence, with H. Armagnat (Chiron, 1924)
- Les Statistiques Quantiques Et Leurs Applications. 2 Vols. (Presse Universitaires de France, 1930)
- La Théorie des Quanta et l'Atome de Bohr (Presse Universitaires de France, 1922, 1931)
- Conductibilité électrique et thermique des métaux (Hermann, 1934)
- Notions Elementaires de Mathématiques pour les Sciences Expérimentales (Libraires de l'Academie de Médecine, 1939)
- The Mathematics of Ultra-High Frequencies Radio (Brown University, 1943)
- Wave Propagation in Periodic Structures: Electric Filters and Crystal Lattices (McGraw–Hill, 1946) (Dover, 1953, 2003)
- Les Tenseurs en mécanique et en élasticité: Cours de physique théorique (Dover, 1946)
- Mathématiques (Masson, 1947)
- Notions élémentaires de mathématiques pour les sciences expérimentales (Masson, 1947)
- Propagation des ondes dans les milieux périodiques, with Maurice Parodi (Masson – Dunod, 1956)
- La science et la théorie de l'information (Masson, 1959)
- Vie Matière et Observation (Albin Michel, 1959)
- Wave Propagation and Group Velocity (Academic Press, 1960)
- Science and Information Theory (Academic Press, 1956; second edition 1962, reprinted Dover, 2004)
- Scientific Uncertainty and Information (Academic Press, 1964)
- Tensors in Mechanics and Elasticity. Translated from the French By Robert O. Brennan. (Engineering Physics: An International Series of Monographs, Vol. 2) (Academic Press, 1964)
- Relativity Reexamined (Academic Press, 1970)
- Tres Vidas Ejemplares en la Física (Madrid, Marzo, 1970)
