= American Martial Arts Alliance =

Non-profit foundation

American Martial Arts Alliance Foundation
- Founder: Jessie Bowen
- Type: Educational foundation IRS 501(c)(3) tax exempt
- Purpose: The American Martial Arts Alliance Foundation is a non-profit organization that provides educational resources and grants within the martial arts community.
- Region served: United States
- Method: Grants and scholarships
- Website: Official website

The American Martial Arts Alliance (or AMAA for short) is a non-profit foundation responsible for holding the annual AMAA Who's Who in the Martial Arts Hall of Fame. Jessie Bowen, Executive Director of the Foundation, has published books about the inductees of the award and dedicated two volumes of the publication to Chuck Norris for a lifetime of achievements.

== AMAA Foundation publications ==
Bowen published the book Martial Arts Masters and Pioneers through the American Martial Arts Alliance Foundation. In its 380 pages, the book tells the stories of 200 martial artists from every corner of the world who have contributed to their communities.

The 2017 edition of Who's Who in the Martial Arts, focuses on the biographies of 200 martial artists and tournament competitors active since the 1960s.

Bowen has published additional martial arts biographical directories through the organization.

=== Bibliography ===
- WHO'S WHO In The Martial Arts: Directory & Biographies (2015 Volume 1).
- Who's Who in the Martial Arts (2016 Volume 2).
- Who's Who in the Martial Arts: Legends Edition (2017 Volume 3).
- Martial Arts Masters & Pioneers: Who's Really Who in the Martial Arts (2018 Volume 4).
- Action Martial Arts Magazine Hall of Honors: Official Who Who's Directory Book' (2019 Volume 1).
- Martial Arts Masters & Pioneers Biography: Chuck Norris - Giving Back For A Lifetime (2020 Volume 1).
- Martial Arts Masters & Pioneers Biography: Chuck Norris - Giving Back For A Lifetime (2020 Volume 2).
