= Garret A. FitzGerald =

Irish pharmacologist

Garret FitzGerald MRIA FRS
- Born: Garret Adare FitzGerald; 11 May 1950 (age 76); Greystones, County Wicklow
- Education: Belvedere College; University College Dublin (MB BCh, MD); Trinity College Dublin (PgD); University of London (MSc)
- Awards: Cameron Prize for Therapeutics of the University of Edinburgh (2007)
- Scientific career
- Fields: Circadian rhythms Cardiology; Vascular biology Molecular clocks Pharmacology
- Workplaces: Vanderbilt University (1980–1991); University College, Dublin (1991–1994); University of Pennsylvania (1994–)
- Website: www.med.upenn.edu/fitzgeraldlab/personnel.html

Garret Adare FitzGerald MRIA FRS (born 11 May 1950) is an Irish physician. He is professor of translational medicine and therapeutics and chair of the department of pharmacology at the Perelman School of Medicine of the University of Pennsylvania. He researches aspects of cardiology, pharmacology, translational medicine, and chronobiology.

== Early life and education ==
FitzGerald was born in Greystones, County Wicklow, on 11 May 1950. He grew up in Dublin, acquiring an unabated passion for rugby. He attended Belvedere College, a Jesuit school for boys in Dublin. Influenced by his grandfather, who had been a professor of Greek, FitzGerald learned five languages at school including Greek and Latin. FitzGerald went to study medicine at University College Dublin (UCD), where he received an MB BCh (honours) degree in 1974 and an MD degree in 1980. In between, he also obtained a Postgraduate diploma in statistics from Trinity College Dublin in 1977 and an MSc degree in statistics at the London School of Hygiene and Tropical Medicine in 1979.

FitzGerald attributes his career in medicine to "a series of accidents". During his final examinations at UCD he was required to dissect the mouthparts of a cockroach. Peering through a microscope, FitzGerald discovered that he had lost one of the main pieces. Disaster seemed certain as he searched the floor on his hands and knees. The exam proctor came to help and eventually emerged with the tiny fragment stuck to her thumb. FitzGerald has stated that without her intervention he would never have become a physician.

== Career ==
After completing his clinical training, FitzGerald took a research position at Vanderbilt University in 1980. He returned to Ireland in 1991 before relocating to the University of Pennsylvania in 1994 as the founding director of the Center for Experimental Therapeutics (CET). He became chair of pharmacology in 1996.

FitzGerald was a member of the Science Board to the US Food and Drug Administration (FDA).

FitzGerald's work contributed substantially to the development of low-dose aspirin to prevent heart attacks and strokes. FitzGerald's lab was the first to predict and then mechanistically explain the cardiovascular hazard from Nonsteroidal anti-inflammatory drugs (NSAIDs), a common class of painkiller. His work showing that selective COX-2 inhibitors depress the production of prostacyclin in the endothelium, thereby increasing cardiovascular risk, was instrumental in the withdrawal of Vioxx (rofecoxib) from the U.S. market in 2004.

== Honours and awards ==
FitzGerald is a member of the National Academy of Medicine, the American Academy of Arts and Sciences, the Royal Society, the Accademia dei Lincei and the Leopoldina, and an honorary member of the Royal Irish Academy.

- 2004 Honorary DSc degree from the University of Edinburgh (United Kingdom)
- 2004 Honorary DSc degree from the National University of Ireland, Dublin
- 2005 Boyle Medal
- 2007 Cameron Prize for Therapeutics of the University of Edinburgh
- 2007 Honorary MD degree from Goethe University Frankfurt (Germany)
- 2009 Taylor Prize
- 2011 Jakob Herz Prize
- 2012 Elected a Fellow of the Royal Society (FRS)
- 2012 Lucian Award
- 2013 Scheele Award
- 2013 Lefoulon-Delalande Prize
- 2013 Schottenstein Prize
- 2013 Honorary DSc degree from King's College London (United Kingdom)
- 2014 St. Patrick's Day Medal from Science Foundation Ireland
- 2017 UCD Alumnus of the Year in Research, Innovation and Impact.
- 2018 Elected to the German National Academy of Sciences
- 2019 Honorary Doctorate from the Royal College of Surgeons in Ireland
- 2021 Honorary Companion of the Order of St Michael and St George (CMG)
