= Thomas White (patriot) =

Thomas White (March 19, 1739 – September 13, 1820) was an Irish American Patriot who took part in the Boston Tea Party, was a member of the Sons of Liberty, and served under General Washington in the American Revolution.

== Early life ==
White was born in Kilkenny, Ireland, in 1739. Around 1771, he immigrated to Philadelphia, Pennsylvania. He was a tailor, and married Elizabeth Jones. They removed to Boston shortly thereafter, where White joined a Masonic order, possibly St. Andrews Lodge, and participated in all the anti-Crown protests.

== Boston Tea Party ==
On December 16, 1773, members of the St. Andrew's Lodge and others boarded British vessels disguised as Indians, and threw shipments of tea into the harbor to protest the Tea Act. Thomas White was among the participants.

== American Revolution ==
White returned to Pennsylvania, serving as soldier in the Continental Army in 2nd Pennsylvania Regiment in the American Revolution

== Later years ==
Following the war, his family migrated west, settling in Huntingdon County, Pennsylvania. He built a farm and raised his children there, who numbered 21. Three of his sons served in the War of 1812; one of them, Ezekiel White, was captured at the Battle of Lundy's Lane, and died of dysentery at a prison camp. White was elected to the American Philosophical Society in 1787.

== Monument ==
On July 4, 1899, members of patriot societies unveiled a monument in honor of White, located at the Evans Cemetery in Bedford County.
