= Patrick M. McCarthy (surgeon) =

American cardiac surgeon

Patrick M. McCarthy is a cardiac surgeon, executive director of the Bluhm Cardiovascular Institute and vice president of the Northwestern Medical Group at Northwestern Medicine, the first Heller-Sacks Professor of Surgery at Northwestern University Feinberg School of Medicine and professor of Biomedical Engineering at Northwestern University McCormick School of Engineering.

== Early life and education ==
McCarthy was raised in Palos Park, Illinois, as the youngest of eight sons in an Irish Catholic family. McCarthy obtained his medical degree at the Loyola University Stritch School of Medicine in 1980. He completed a residency in general surgery and a fellowship in thoracic and cardiovascular surgery at Mayo Clinic, and a fellowship in cardiovascular transplantation at Stanford University.

== Career ==
McCarthy joined the Mayo Clinic in 1980. After eight years at the Mayo Clinic, McCarthy worked at Stanford University Medical Center for 18 months before joining the Cleveland Clinic where he worked for 14 years.

In 2004, McCarthy moved back to Chicago and joined the Northwestern University Feinberg School of Medicine as the first Heller-Sacks Professor of Cardiothoracic Surgery and executive director of the new Bluhm Cardiovascular Institute, which had been created with a $10 million donation from billionaire philanthropist Neil Bluhm. Through his work with the School of Engineering, McCarthy serves as a Farley Fellow.

== Inventions ==
McCarthy co-founded a company called Cardiac Valve Innovations in 2015, directed to improving heart valve repair rings.

=== D-EtLogix Ring ===
McCarthy is the inventor of the Edward's D-EtLogix Ring, formally known as the Myxo ETlogix ring. The D-EtLogix Ring is a modification of an earlier device, the Geoform ring, approved by the Food and Drug Administration (FDA). FDA policy permits minor modifications without regulatory approval.

Two patients brought a lawsuit against McCarthy, accusing him of experimenting with the ring on them without their knowledge and concealing evidence of complications. One patient dropped their suit and the other patient brought their suit to trial. McCarthy was found not guilty after the jury decided that the charges brought by the patient had no merit.
