= Margaret McCarthy letter =

Margaret McCarthy (1825 or 1826 – death date unknown) was an Irish migrant to the United States.

On September 22, 1850, she wrote a letter to her family, as a guide for other emigrants. She explained that once in the United States, moving west was very expensive, though she did not know that those who did go rarely had an improved standard of living.

Her letter is typical of that of many immigrants, containing optimism about her own condition, and concern for the family and people she left behind.

== Biography ==
McCarthy was born to Alexander "Sandy" McCarthy, a carpenter for the Crown Estate who lived in Boherboy, Ireland, and his wife, Neil.

McCarthy travelled from Kingwilliamstown in County Cork to Nohavaldaly, near Kanturk, during the Great Famine. She left from Liverpool, England, on September 7, 1849, on the Columbus, and arrived in New York City, United States, on October 22 of that year.

== Contents ==
My Dr. Father and Mother, Brothers and Sisters,

I write these few lines to you hoping That tines may find you all in as good State of health as I am in at present thank God. I received your welcome letter to me Dated 22nd of May which was A Credit to me for the Stile and Elligence of its Fluent Language but I must Say Rather Flattering. My Dr. Father I must only say that this is a good place and A good Country for if one place does not Suit A man he can go to Another and can very easy please himself But there is one thing that's Ruining this place Especially the Frontirs towns and Cities where the Flow of Emmigration is most, the Emmigrants has not money Enough to Take them to the Interior of the Country which oblidges them to Remain here ifor which Reason Causes the less demand for Labour and also the great Reduction in wages. [...]

Read more on Wikisource
