= Schottenstein Prize in Cardiovascular Sciences =

Medical award

The Schottenstein Prize in Cardiovascular Sciences is awarded biennially to physicians or biomedical scientists who are judged to have made extraordinary and sustained contributions to improving cardiovascular health. The award is worth US$100,000 and is conferred by The Ohio State University Wexner Medical Center’s Heart and Vascular Center.

== Laureates ==
Year	Winner
2017	Helen Hobbs
2015	Roberto Bolli
2013	Garret A. FitzGerald
2011	Christine E. Seidman
2009	Pascal Goldschmidt

== See also ==
- List of medicine awards
