= Myra Kelly =

American teacher and writer (1875–1910)

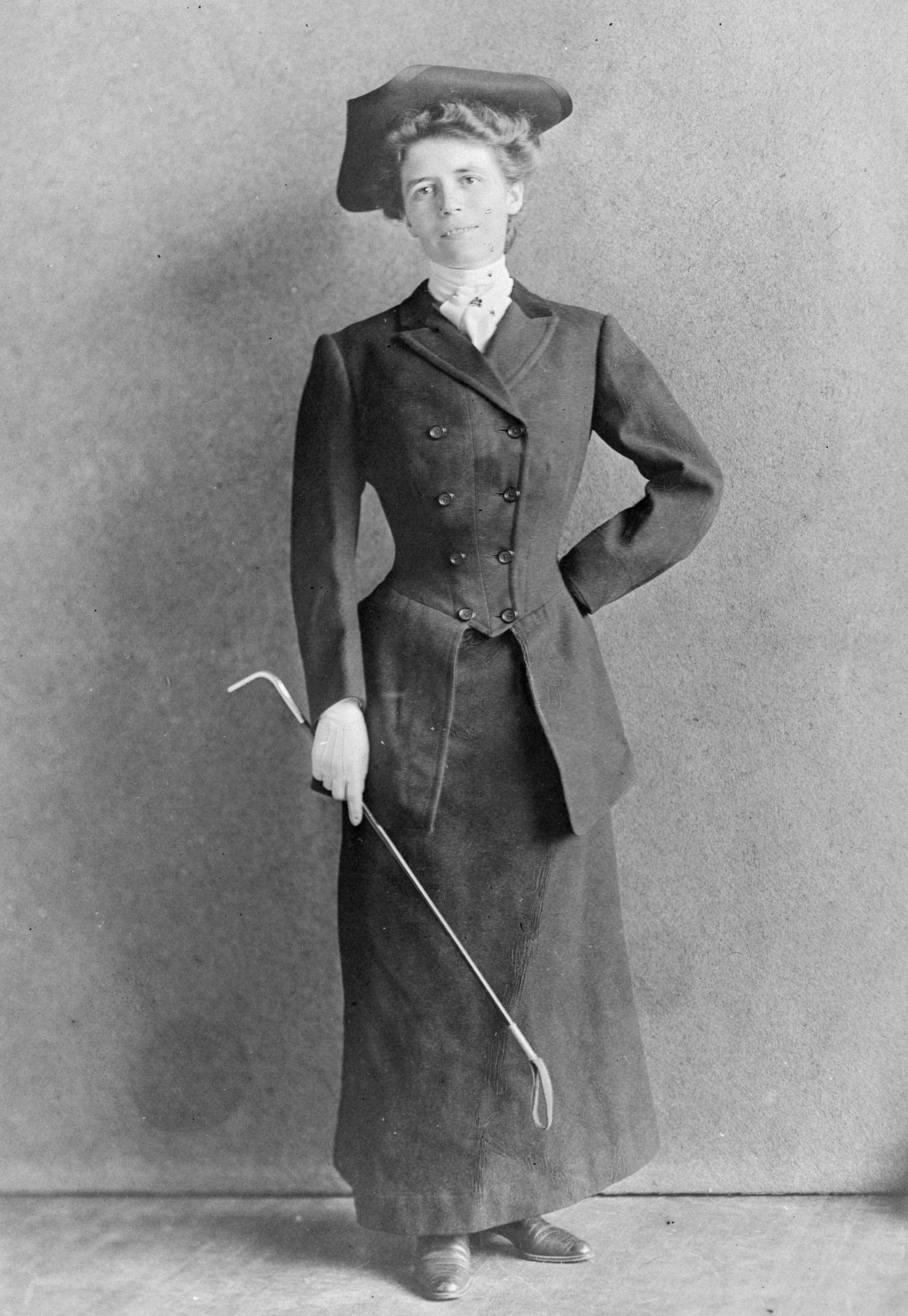
Myra Kelly, 1908

Myra Kelly (1875 –1910) was an Irish American schoolteacher and author.

== Life ==
Kelly was born in Dublin. She came to the United States with her father, a physician who established a practice on the Lower East Side of Manhattan. She attended the Horace Mann School and Teachers College, Columbia University, graduating in 1899.

Kelly taught elementary school at Public School 147 from 1899 to 1901. She produced three collections of stories based on her experiences as a teacher. Her character Constance Bailey teaches Irish and Russian Jewish immigrant children. A minor theme within her works is the changing character of the neighborhood and the displacement of Irish immigrant families. After the publication of her "In Loco Parentis", US President Theodore Roosevelt wrote her a letter of appreciation.

Kelly married Allan Macnaughton in 1905. Prior to her death, she also wrote the romance novels Rosnah and The Golden Season.

Kelly developed tuberculosis and died on March 30, 1910, in Torquay, England. She was 35 years old.

== Works ==
- Little Citizens, The Humours of School Life (1905)
- The Isle of Dreams (1907)
- Wards of Liberty (1907)
- Rosnah (1908)
- The Golden Season (1909)
- Little Aliens (1910)
