= Helen Curtin Moskey =

Irish-American poet

Helen Curtin Moskey (March 27, 1931, in Hartford, Connecticut – March 25, 2003, in Hartford, Connecticut) was an Irish-American poet of dual U.S.-Irish nationality.

In 1994, she was awarded a Bachelor of Arts degree in English, with honors, from Trinity College (Connecticut), Hartford, Connecticut. Her senior thesis was titled A Kerry Ethnography: A History of the Descendants of Owen O'Sullivan Mors, Muingaphuca, Caragh Lake, County Kerry, 1926-1992. The Kerry Ethnography was later published posthumously in an anthology of her writings on Ireland and family history titled The O'Sullivans of Muingaphuca.

She subsequently studied poetry with several established American poets, including Mark Doty, Stanley Kunitz, and Yusef Komunyakaa; at the Fine Arts Work Center in Provincetown, Massachusetts; and at the University of Canterbury in Christchurch, New Zealand. Additionally, the Irish poet Eiléan Ní Chuilleanáin was a friend and advisor. Moskey's work appeared in occasional compilations of poetry. At the time of her death, she was preparing a volume of her selected poetry for publication.

Her experiences as the child of an Irish immigrant mother; her extended stays at the family ancestral home at Muingaphuca, Caragh Lake, County Kerry; and her experience as a mid-century American woman who raised five children through the intense social transformation of American life from the post-war era to the 1970s, were powerful influences on the tone, style, and subject matter of her poetry.
