= Slater–Condon rules =

Rules in computational chemistry

Within computational chemistry, the Slater–Condon rules express integrals of one- and two-body operators over wavefunctions constructed as Slater determinants of orthonormal orbitals in terms of the individual orbitals. In doing so, the original integrals involving N-electron wavefunctions are reduced to sums over integrals involving at most two molecular orbitals, or in other words, the original 3N dimensional integral is expressed in terms of many three- and six-dimensional integrals.

The rules are used in deriving the working equations for all methods of approximately solving the Schrödinger equation that employ wavefunctions constructed from Slater determinants. These include Hartree–Fock theory, where the wavefunction is a single determinant, and all those methods which use Hartree–Fock theory as a reference such as Møller–Plesset perturbation theory, and Coupled cluster and Configuration interaction theories.

In 1929 John C. Slater derived expressions for diagonal matrix elements of an approximate Hamiltonian while investigating atomic spectra within a perturbative approach. The following year Edward Condon extended the rules to non-diagonal matrix elements. In 1955 Per-Olov Löwdin further generalized these results for wavefunctions constructed from non-orthonormal orbitals, leading to what are known as the Löwdin rules.

== Mathematical background ==
In terms of an antisymmetrization operator ($\mathcal{A}$) acting upon a product of N orthonormal spin-orbitals (with r and σ denoting spatial and spin variables), a determinantal wavefunction is denoted as

$$|\Psi\rangle = \mathcal{A}(\phi_{1}(\mathbf{r}_{1}\sigma_{1})\phi_{2}(\mathbf{r}_{2}\sigma_{2})\cdots\phi_{m}(\mathbf{r}_{m}\sigma_{m})\phi_{n}(\mathbf{r}_{n}\sigma_{n})\cdots\phi_{N}(\mathbf{r}_{N}\sigma_{N})).$$

A wavefunction differing from this by only a single orbital (the m'th orbital) will be denoted as

$$|\Psi_{m}^{p}\rangle = \mathcal{A}(\phi_{1}(\mathbf{r}_{1}\sigma_{1})\phi_{2}(\mathbf{r}_{2}\sigma_{2})\cdots\phi_{p}(\mathbf{r}_{m}\sigma_{m})\phi_{n}(\mathbf{r}_{n}\sigma_{n})\cdots\phi_{N}(\mathbf{r}_{N}\sigma_{N})),$$

and a wavefunction differing by two orbitals will be denoted as

$$|\Psi_{mn}^{pq}\rangle = \mathcal{A}(\phi_{1}(\mathbf{r}_{1}\sigma_{1})\phi_{2}(\mathbf{r}_{2}\sigma_{2})\cdots\phi_{p}(\mathbf{r}_{m}\sigma_{m})\phi_{q}(\mathbf{r}_{n}\sigma_{n})\cdots\phi_{N}(\mathbf{r}_{N}\sigma_{N})).$$

For any particular one- or two-body operator, Ô, the Slater–Condon rules show how to simplify the following types of integrals:

$$\langle\Psi|\hat{O}|\Psi\rangle, \langle\Psi|\hat{O}|\Psi_{m}^{p}\rangle,\ \mathrm{and}\ \langle\Psi|\hat{O}|\Psi_{mn}^{pq}\rangle.$$

Matrix elements for two wavefunctions differing by more than two orbitals vanish unless higher order interactions are introduced.

== Integrals of one-body operators ==
One body operators depend only upon the position or momentum of a single electron at any given instant. Examples are the kinetic energy, dipole moment, and total angular momentum operators.

A one-body operator in an N-particle system is decomposed as

$$\hat{G}_1 = \sum_{i=1}^{N}\ \hat{h}(i).$$

The Slater–Condon rules for such an operator are:

$$\begin{align}
\langle\Psi|\hat{G}_1|\Psi\rangle &= \sum_{i=1}^{N}\ \langle\phi_{i}|\hat{h}|\phi_{i}\rangle, \\
\langle\Psi|\hat{G}_1|\Psi_{m}^{p}\rangle &= \langle\phi_{m}|\hat{h}|\phi_{p}\rangle, \\
\langle\Psi|\hat{G}_1|\Psi_{mn}^{pq}\rangle &= 0.
\end{align}$$

== Integrals of two-body operators ==
Two-body operators couple two particles at any given instant. Examples being the electron-electron repulsion, magnetic dipolar coupling, and total angular momentum-squared operators.

A two-body operator in an N-particle system is decomposed as

$$\hat{G}_2 = \frac 12 \sum_{i=1}^{N}\sum_{{j =1}\atop{j\neq i}}^{N}\ \hat{g}(i,j).$$

The Slater–Condon rules for such an operator are:

$$\begin{align}
\langle\Psi|\hat{G}_2|\Psi\rangle &= \frac{1}{2}\sum_{i=1}^{N}\sum_{j=1\atop{j\neq i}}^{N}\ \bigg(\langle\phi_{i}\phi_{j}|\hat{g}|\phi_{i}\phi_{j}\rangle - \langle\phi_{i}\phi_{j}|\hat{g}|\phi_{j}\phi_{i}\rangle\bigg), \\
\langle\Psi|\hat{G}_2|\Psi_{m}^{p}\rangle &= \sum_{i=1}^{N}\ \bigg(\langle\phi_{m}\phi_{i}|\hat{g}|\phi_{p}\phi_{i}\rangle - \langle\phi_{m}\phi_{i}|\hat{g}|\phi_{i}\phi_{p}\rangle\bigg), \\
\langle\Psi|\hat{G}_2|\Psi_{mn}^{pq}\rangle &= \langle\phi_{m}\phi_{n}|\hat{g}|\phi_{p}\phi_{q}\rangle - \langle\phi_{m}\phi_{n}|\hat{g}|\phi_{q}\phi_{p}\rangle,
\end{align}$$

where

$$\langle\phi_{i}\phi_{j}|\hat{g}|\phi_{k}\phi_{l}\rangle = \int\mathrm{d}\mathbf{r}\int\mathrm{d}\mathbf{r}'\ \phi_{i}^{*}(\mathbf{r})\phi_{j}^{*}(\mathbf{r}')g(\mathbf{r},\mathbf{r}')\phi_{k}(\mathbf{r})\phi_{l}(\mathbf{r}').$$

Any matrix elements of a two-body operator with wavefunctions that differ in three or more spin orbitals will vanish, meaning

$$\langle\Psi|\hat{G}_2|\Psi_{mno}^{pqr}\rangle = 0.$$
