= Brillouin =

Brillouin is a surname. Notable people with the surname include:

- Marcel Brillouin (1854–1948), French physicist
- Léon Brillouin (1889–1969), French physicist, son of Marcel
