= La Martinière =

La Martinière may refer to:

== People ==
- Pierre Martin de La Martinière (1634–c.1676 or c.1690), French physician and explorer
- Antoine-Augustin Bruzen de La Martinière (1683–1746), French historian
- Germain Pichault de La Martinière (1697–1783), first surgeon to Louis XV and Louis XVI; see École de Chirurgie
- Joseph Hugues Boissieu La Martinière (1758–1788), French botanist and biologist
- Jean Baptiste Joseph Breton de La Martinière (1777–1852), French judicial stenographer and translator of The Wanderer
- Hervé de La Martinière (1947–2025), French businessman and publisher

== Education ==
- La Martinière College in India and France
  - La Martinière Calcutta in Kolkata, India
  - La Martinière College, Lucknow in Lucknow, India
  - Lycée La Martinière Monplaisir in Lyon, France

== Other ==
- La Martinière Groupe, a French publisher
- La Martinière, a French ship which transported convicts from Saint-Martin-de-Ré to the Prison of St-Laurent-du-Maroni in French Guiana
- Saint-Léger-de-la-Martinière, a French commune in the département of Les Deux-Sèvres
