= Martinière =

Martinière may refer to:

- La Martinière (disambiguation)
- Stephan Martinière, artist, cartoonist and animation director
