= Ave Maria (1984 film) =

- Isabelle Pasco
- Directed by: Jacques Richard
- Produced by: Irène Silberman
- Cinematography: Dominique Brenguier
- Edited by: Luc Barnier
- Music by: Jorge Arriagada
- Production company: Films Galaxie
- Release date: 31 October 1984
- Running time: 105 minutes
- Country: France
- Language: French

Ave Maria is a 1984 French drama film directed by Jacques Richard, who co-wrote screenplay with Paul Gégauff.

== Plot ==
Fifteen-year-old Ursula awakens to sensuality with Paul, a teenager of her age. She lives in a small village, in a fairly closed environment, strongly steeped in religion.

The inhabitants of this village live under the domination of the defrocked priest Adolphe Éloi, whom everyone calls "the Holy Father". The latter and his companion Berthe Granjeux, "the Holy Mother", try to subdue the young girl who is truly the only one who does not accept their tyranny. They try to make her feel guilty, and it is out of revolt that the teenager imposes herself and opposes them with increasingly perverse tendencies.

On Christmas Eve, Adolphe Éloi’s "faithful" are on trial. During this night dedicated to exorcism, Ursula must undergo an avalanche of corporal punishment intended to cleanse her of all her sins.

== Cast ==
- Anna Karina as Berthe Granjeux
- Féodor Atkine as Adolphe Eloi
- Isabelle Pasco as Ursula
- Pascale Ogier as Angélique
- Dora Doll as Constance
- Bernard Freyd as Mathieu

== Production ==
The film was shot mainly at the Château de Melzéar in Paizay-le-Tort.

== Poster censorship ==
The poster, which features Isabelle Pasco crucified topless, caused a scandal in 1984. The controversial image was photographed by Bettina Rheims and was intended to promote the film. Director Jacques Richard was sued by the Society of Saint Pius X, led by Marcel Lefebvre at the time, and eight other Catholic associations who demanded a ban on the poster. Justice ruled in favor of the plaintiffs in summary proceedings and prohibited the public visibility of the Ave Maria poster for its supposed outrageous nature. The ban on the poster was not appealed.

In 2019, director Jacques Richard reflected on the scandal: "Their idea was to strike minds with a strong visual. It was a mistake. Catholics did not go to see the film saying to themselves: we are being attacked. Atheists said to themselves: a film that talks about religion doesn't concern us. However, the film was not an attack on Catholics, it denounced sects."
