= Arboretum du Chemin de la Découverte =

Arboretum in Nouvelle-Aquitaine, France

Coordinates: 46.223°N 0.144°W

The Arboretum du Chemin de la Découverte is an arboretum located in Melle, Deux-Sèvres, Nouvelle-Aquitaine, France. It is open daily without charge.

The arboretum was established in 1987 along a disused railway track (6 km), and now contains more than 1,000 species of woody plants, with good collections of ash, birch, chestnut, hackberry, hornbeam, lime trees, and willows, as well as more than 250 rose varieties.

== See also ==
- List of botanical gardens in France
