= Aachen penny of Charlemagne =

Coin

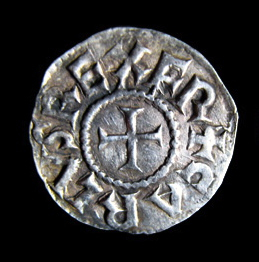
Obverse of the Aachen silver penny

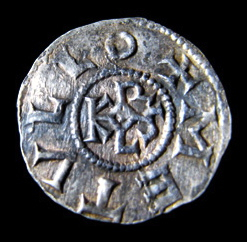
Reverse of the Aachen silver penny with signum manus

The Aachen penny of Charlemagne, a Carolingian silver coin, was found on 22 February 2008 in the foundations of the Palatine Chapel in Aachen, during archaeological work in the northeastern bay of the hexadecagon. This is the first discovery of coinage from the time of Charlemagne at Aachen.

== Description of the coin ==
The obverse of the coin features a cross in the centre, surrounded by the Latin inscription CARLVS REX FR[ancorum], which means Charles, King of the Fr[anks]; a cross is placed between FR and CARLVS as a separator. On the reverse, the famous monogram of Charlemagne is in the centre, with the v-shaped execution line. In the monetary reform of 792/794 it was determined that a pound would contain twenty shillings or 240 pennies. The introduction of the new monetary system with broadly unified coinage types (novi denarii) in the Frankish realm was decreed at the Council of Frankfurt in 794. On this coinage type, the relevant mint is named on the reverse inscription - in the case of the Aachen penny found in 2007, the inscription is METVLLO. The silver penny was, therefore, minted in the period after 794 in the city of Melle, in Poitou-Charentes (modern-day France).

== Archaeological significance ==
The coin was probably deposited during the construction of the Palatine chapel, before the floor was completed. Ulrike Hecker said, "The coin was found in the backfill from the excavation of the grave of 1910, which was made in an area of intact flooring. This origin leads to the conclusion that the Carolingian floor was first laid after 794." The penny, then, along with dendrochronological finds and the literary records of Einhard and Sigebert of Gembloux, is of great significance for dating the beginning of construction of the Carolingian Palatine Chapel, which according to this latest discovery can only be dated "soon after 795."
