= Melle, Deux-Sèvres =

Melle
- Commune
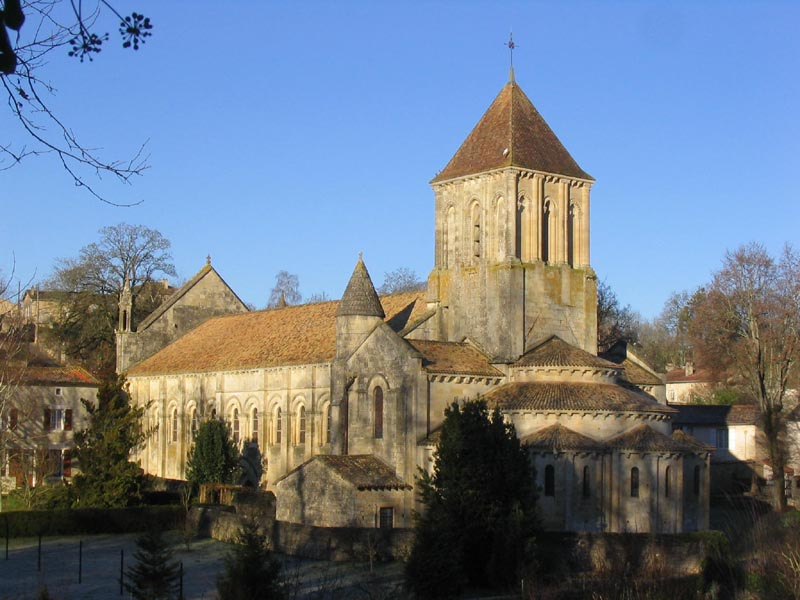
- Saint-Hilaire Church

- Coat of arms
- Location of Melle
- Location within France Location within Nouvelle-Aquitaine
- Coordinates: 46°13′19″N 00°08′42″W
- Country: France
- Region: Nouvelle-Aquitaine
- Department: Deux-Sèvres
- Arrondissement: Niort
- Canton: Melle
- Intercommunality: Mellois-en-Poitou

Government
  - Mayor (2020–2026): Sylvain Griffault
- Area^{1}: 65.34 km^{2} (25.23 sq mi)
- Elevation: 119 m (390 ft)
- Highest elevation: 183 m (600 ft)
- Lowest elevation: 57 m (187 ft)
- Population (2023): 5,752
  - Density: 88.03/km^{2} (228.0/sq mi)
- Time zone: UTC+01:00 (CET)
  - Summer (DST): UTC+02:00 (CEST)
- INSEE/Postal code: 79174 /79500
- ^{1} French Land Register data, which excludes lakes, ponds, glaciers > 1 km^{2} (0.386 sq mi or 247 acres) and river estuaries.

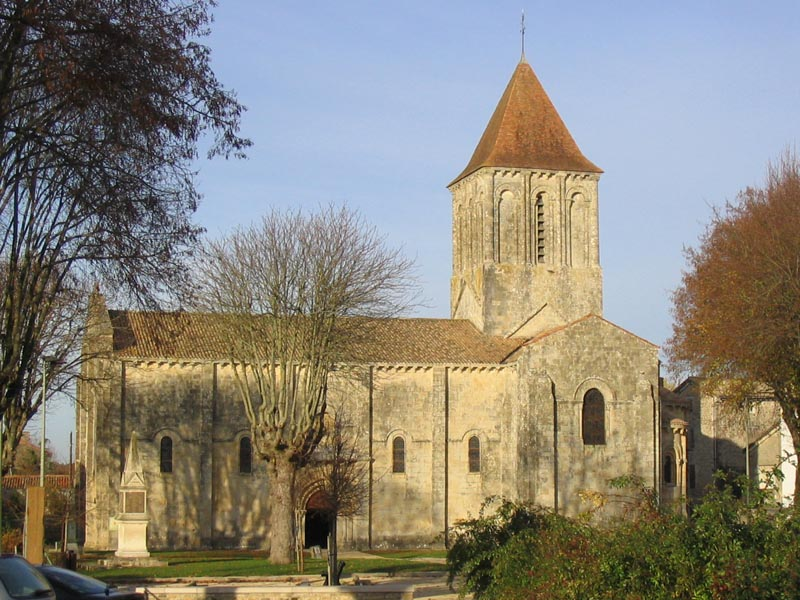
Saint Pierre

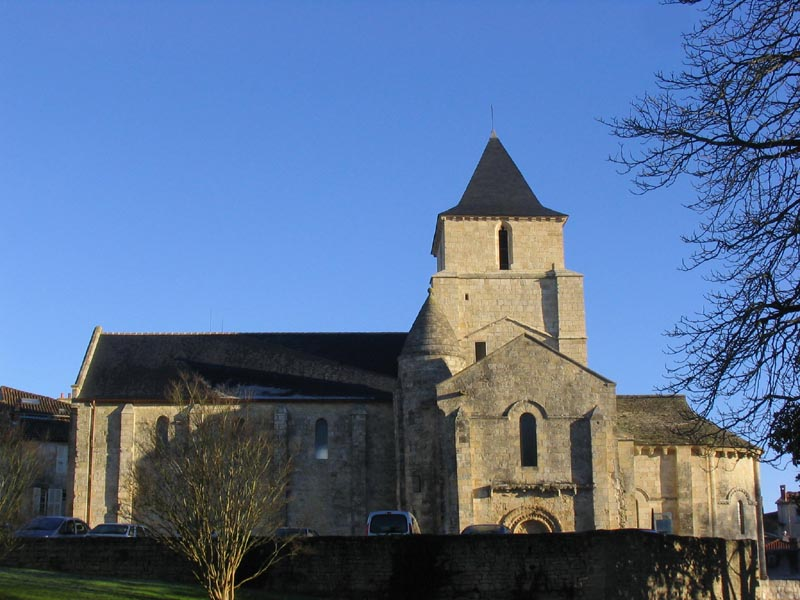
Saint Savinien

Melle (French pronunciation: [mɛl]) is a commune in the Deux-Sèvres department in western France. On 1 January 2019, the former communes Mazières-sur-Béronne, Paizay-le-Tort, Saint-Léger-de-la-Martinière and Saint-Martin-lès-Melle were merged into Melle.

It is today best known as the home town of Ségolène Royal, the 2007 Socialist candidate for the election of the Presidency of the Republic. The director Laurent Cantet was born here as well as the archaeologist Gaston Deschamps (1861–1931).

== History ==
During the early Middle Ages, Melle was an active center of minting, thanks to important silver mines located under and around the city. These were mined from 602 to at least 995. The mined ore was galena: lead containing silver. The lead served first of all to pay a tribute to the Frankish kings: under Dagobert I, eight thousand pounds were sent to Paris every year, where he served for the cover of the Basilica of St Denis.

Under the reign of Charlemagne it was a mining centre and was, for a time, the home of the French mint: the Aachen penny of Charlemagne, the first coin of Charlemagne to be found at his capital of Aachen/Aix, was minted at Metullo. The silver mines which supplied the mint continued to function off and on before being forgotten altogether in the 18th century, not to be discovered again until the 20th century. The mine is now a tourist attraction and can be visited most days of the year.

In the Middle Ages, Melle flourished as a town, as we can see from its surviving medieval houses and the three churches, built in the Romanesque style during the 11th and 12th centuries.

== Population ==
Historical population
Year	Pop.	±% p.a.
1968	6,430	—
1975	6,592	+0.36%
1982	6,308	−0.63%
1990	6,518	+0.41%
1999	6,374	−0.25%
2007	6,327	−0.09%
2012	6,453	+0.40%
2017	6,213	−0.76%
2023	5,752	−1.28%
Source: INSEE

== Sights ==
Melle is an ancient town which has traditional French architecture, some dating back before the 17th century.

The silver mine in Melle is claimed to be the oldest silver mine in Europe still open to the public. The mine itself is some 20 km (12 mi) long, and visitors can explore 350 m of it, with guided tours each day.

The church of Saint-Hilaire was listed as a UNESCO World Heritage Site as part of the World Heritage Sites of the Routes of Santiago de Compostela in France.

Among other places to visit are the wash-houses and fountains of Melle. 400m from the church of Saint-Pierre is a small octagonal building with an arcade around its perimeter. There a fountain pours from the rock, into the basin where women gathered to do their washing. In the meadow nearby is a medieval fountain and basin, known as the Pré de la Maladerie, which was reserved for lepers.

Melle also boasts a 6 km (3.7 mi) walk known as the Arboretum du Chemin de la Découverte. This walk passes more than 1000 species of trees and shrubs from the temperate areas of the world, and a collection of over 100 roses.

== Melle today ==
Today, Melle is the major hub of business for the nearby towns of Saint-Léger, Chef-Boutonne, and Celles-sur-Belle. It is also home to the lycée (high school) for the region.

Melle and the surrounding countryside are known for their own particular type of goat's cheese, 'chabichou'.

Every Friday, a market is held on Place Bujault.

== See also ==
- Communes of the Deux-Sèvres department
