= Mazières-sur-Béronne =

- Part of Melle
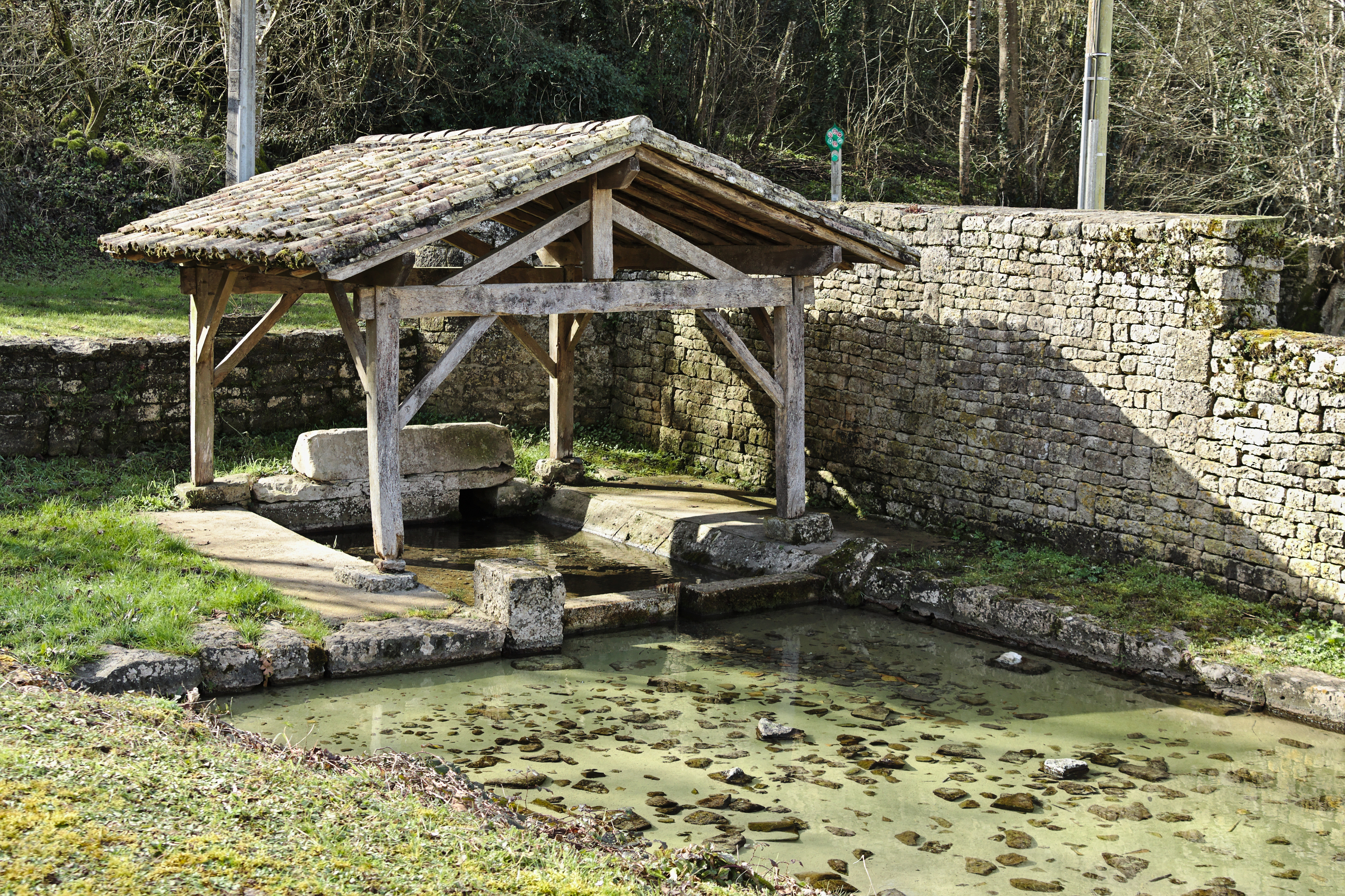
- The washing house in Mazières-sur-Béronne
- Location of Mazières-sur-Béronne
- Location within France Location within Nouvelle-Aquitaine
- Coordinates: 46°12′03″N 0°10′56″W
- Country: France
- Region: Nouvelle-Aquitaine
- Department: Deux-Sèvres
- Arrondissement: Niort
- Canton: Melle
- Commune: Melle
- Area^{1}: 9.50 km^{2} (3.67 sq mi)
- Elevation: 110 m (360 ft)
- Highest elevation: 117 m (384 ft)
- Lowest elevation: 57 m (187 ft)
- Population (2022): 381
  - Density: 40.1/km^{2} (104/sq mi)
- Time zone: UTC+01:00 (CET)
  - Summer (DST): UTC+02:00 (CEST)
- Postal code: 79500
- ^{1} French Land Register data, which excludes lakes, ponds, glaciers > 1 km^{2} (0.386 sq mi or 247 acres) and river estuaries.

Mazières-sur-Béronne (French pronunciation: [mazjɛʁ syʁ beʁɔn]) is a former commune in the Deux-Sèvres department in western France. On 1 January 2019, it was merged into the commune Melle.

== See also ==
- Communes of the Deux-Sèvres department
