= Marcel Brillouin =

French physicist and mathematician (1854–1948

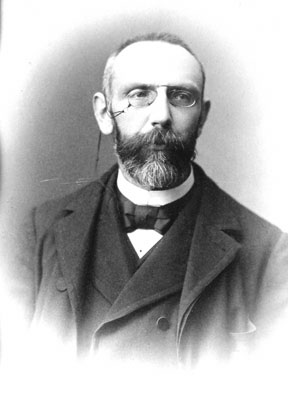
- Marcel Brillouin in 1895
- Born: Louis Marcel Brillouin; 19 December 1854; Saint-Martin-lès-Melle, France
- Died: 16 June 1948 (aged 93); Paris, France
- Children: 3, including Léon Brillouin
- Awards: Legion of Honour
- Scientific career
- Fields: Physics, Thermodynamics
- Workplaces: École Normale Supérieure
- Thesis: Intégration des équations différentielles auxquelles conduit l'étude des phénomènes d'induction dans les circuits dérivés (1881)
- Doctoral students: Pierre Weiss; Jean Coulomb

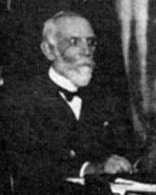
Marcel Brillouin at the first Solvay Conference, in 1911

Louis Marcel Brillouin (French pronunciation: [lwi maʁsɛl bʁijwɛ̃]; 19 December 1854 – 16 June 1948) was a French physicist and mathematician. He carried research in many realms of physics, including fluid mechanics, thermodynamics, statistical mechanics, geophysics, quantum mechanics and general relativity. Physicist Reinhold Furth referred to Brillioun as the Nestor of Physics, in reference to mythological figure, Nestor.

== Life ==
Born in Saint-Martin-lès-Melle, Deux-Sèvres, France, his father Louis Georges Brillouin was a painter who moved to Paris when Marcel was a boy. There he attended the Lycée Condorcet. The Brillouin family returned to Saint-Martin-lès-Melle during the Franco-Prussian War of 1870 to escape the fighting. There he spent time teaching himself from his maternal grandfather's philosophy books.

After the war, he returned to Paris and entered the École normale supérieure in 1874 and graduated in 1878. He became a physics assistant to Éleuthère Mascart (his future father-in-law) at the Collège de France, while at the same time working for his doctorate in mathematics and physics, which he was awarded in 1881. The topic of his doctoral thesis was on differential equations for inductances in electrical circuits (French: Intégration des équations différentielles auxquelles conduit l'étude des phénomènes d'induction dans les circuits dérivé). He independently rediscovered some equations that were found earlier by Hermann von Helmholtz in 1851.

=== Professional career ===
Brillouin then held successive posts as assistant professor of physics at universities in Nancy, Dijon and Toulouse before returning to the École normale supérieure in Paris in 1887. Later, he was professor of mathematical physics at the Collège de France from 1900 to retirement in 1931.

In 1911 he was one of only six French physicists invited to the first Solvay Conference. He participated at the construction of quantum theory.

He also attended 1922 debates on solutions of general relativity in College de France, to which Albert Einstein was invited.

=== Personal life ===
In 1888, he married Charlotte Marguerite Mascart. Together, they had three children: Léon, who became a prominent physicist; Jacques (1892-1971) who became a composer; and Madeleine (1894-1978).

Brillouin died in Paris (16 June 1948).

== Research ==
During his career he was the author of over 200 experimental and theoretic papers on a wide range of topics which include the kinetic theory of gases, viscosity, thermodynamics, electricity, and Earth science. Most notably he:

- proposed a theory of dispersion of sound in aerodynamics.
- research on the circulation of the atmosphere, the formation of rain and the theory of the tides.
- expanded upon Helmholtz's work on discontinuity surfaces in fluid flow. He explored the formation of vortices. Brillouin proved in 1911 that the discontinuity surfaces must be infinite in a two-dimensional flow, otherwise it will lead to d’Alembert’s paradox.
- replaced the Nipkow disk in mechanical televisions. He introduced a lensed disk and variable aperture in 1891.
- measured the curvature of the geoid within the Simplon Tunnel in 1906. He used a portable model of the Eötvös balance that he built.
- showed in 1907, that the specific heat of vacuum, due to black-body radiation is proportional to the T^{3} (where T is the temperature).
- proposed early theories of quantum mechanics, using a continuum instead of quanta. His 1919-1920 works led to Louis de Broglie theory of matter waves hypothesis.
- participated in the early debates on solutions to Einstein field equations. He studied the case of a massive point particle in curved space-time, he showed that there cannot be an object whose radius is smaller than its Schwarzschild radius.

== Awards and honors ==
He was awarded the Prix La Caze for 1912. Brillouin was elected to the Académie des Sciences in 1921. He was named knight (1902) and officer (1923) of the Legion of Honour.
