= Palatine Chapel, Aachen =

Church building in Aachen, Germany

Coordinates: 50°46′29″N 6°05′04″E

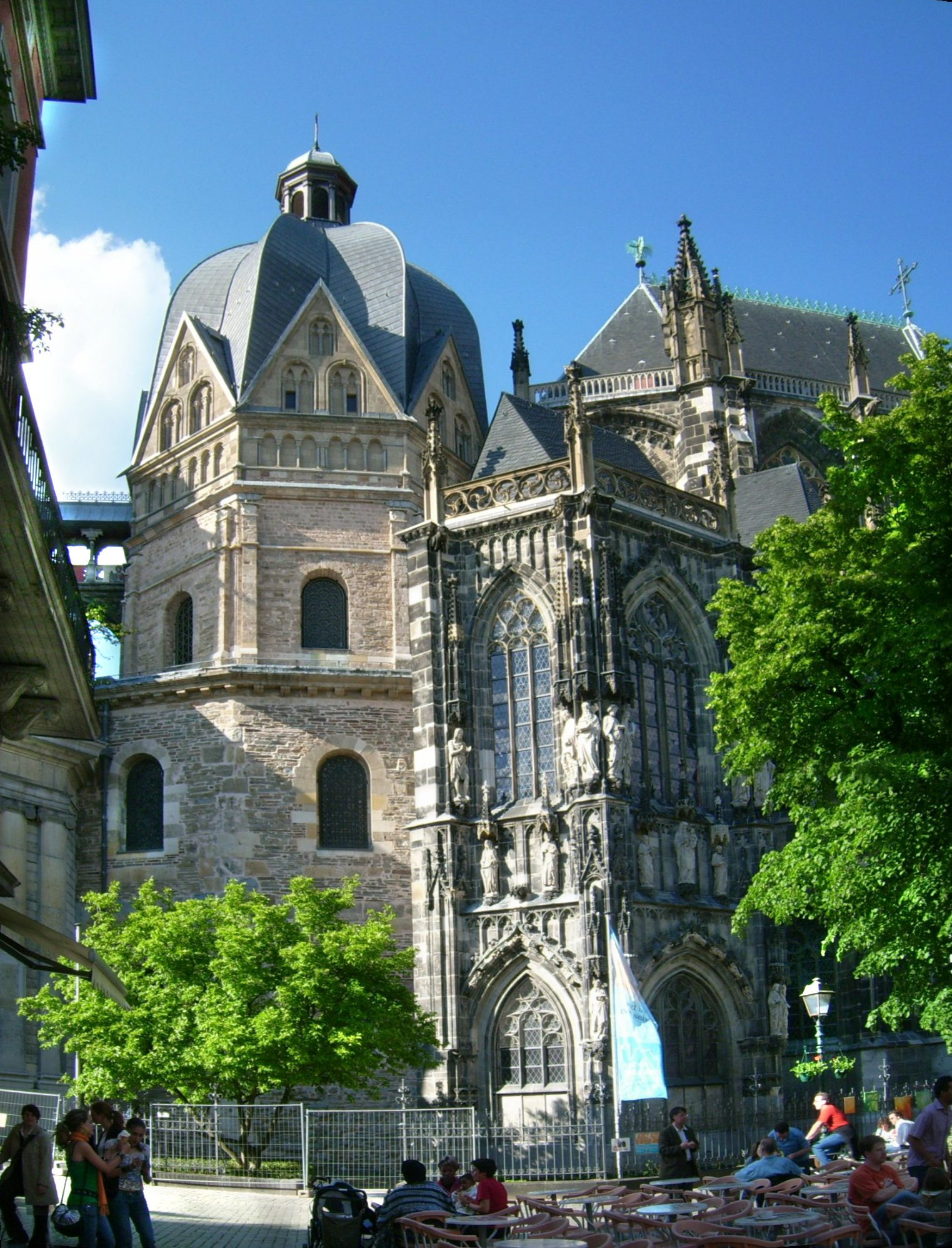
Exterior view

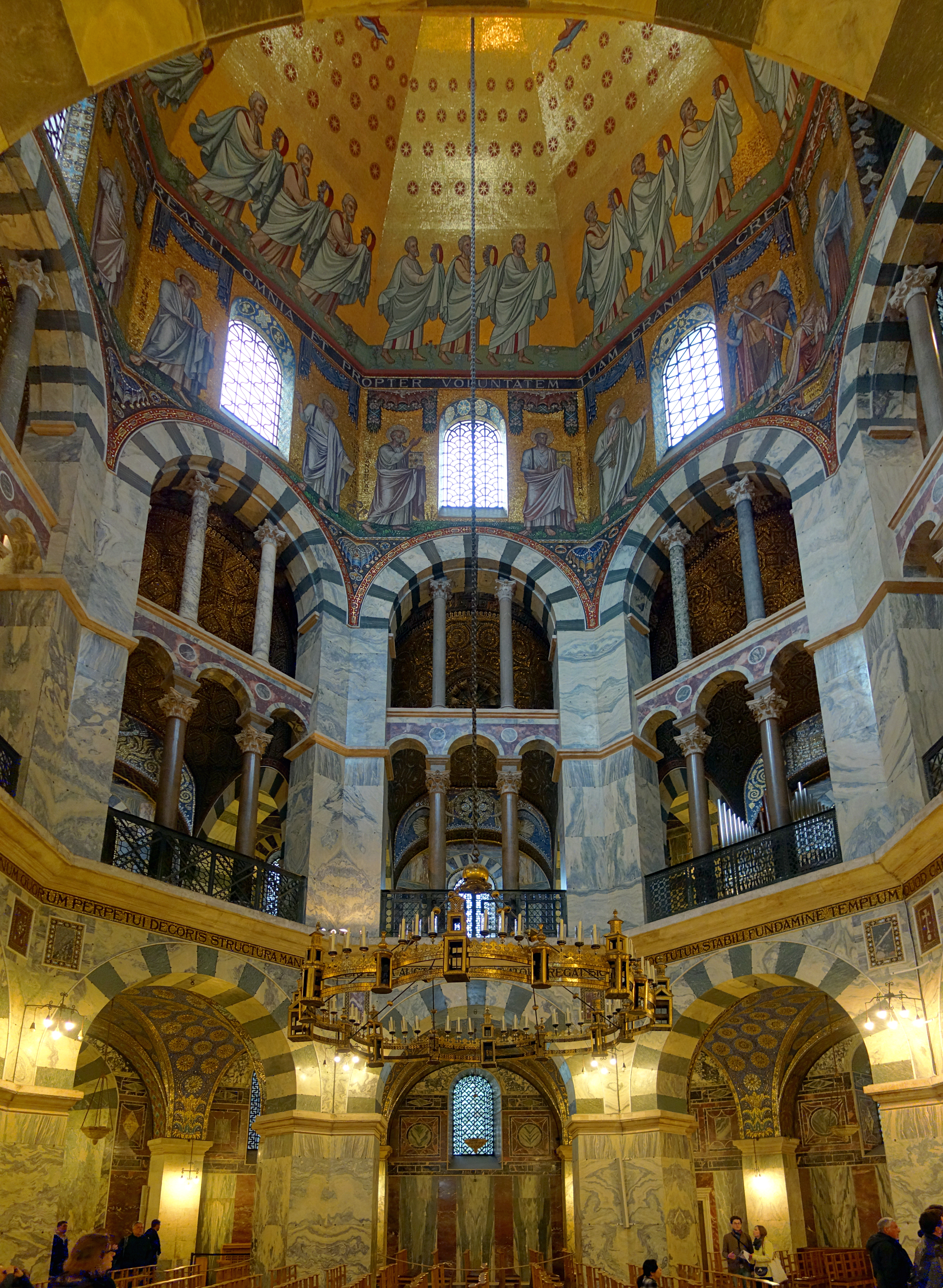
Interior view

The Palatine Chapel in Aachen is an early medieval chapel and remaining component of Charlemagne's Palace of Aachen in what is now Germany. Although the palace itself no longer exists, the chapel was preserved and now forms the central part of Aachen Cathedral. It is Aachen's major landmark and a central monument of the Carolingian Renaissance. The chapel held the remains of Charlemagne. Later it was appropriated by the Ottonians and coronations were held there from 936 to 1531.

As part of Aachen Cathedral, the chapel is designated as a UNESCO World Heritage Site.

== History ==
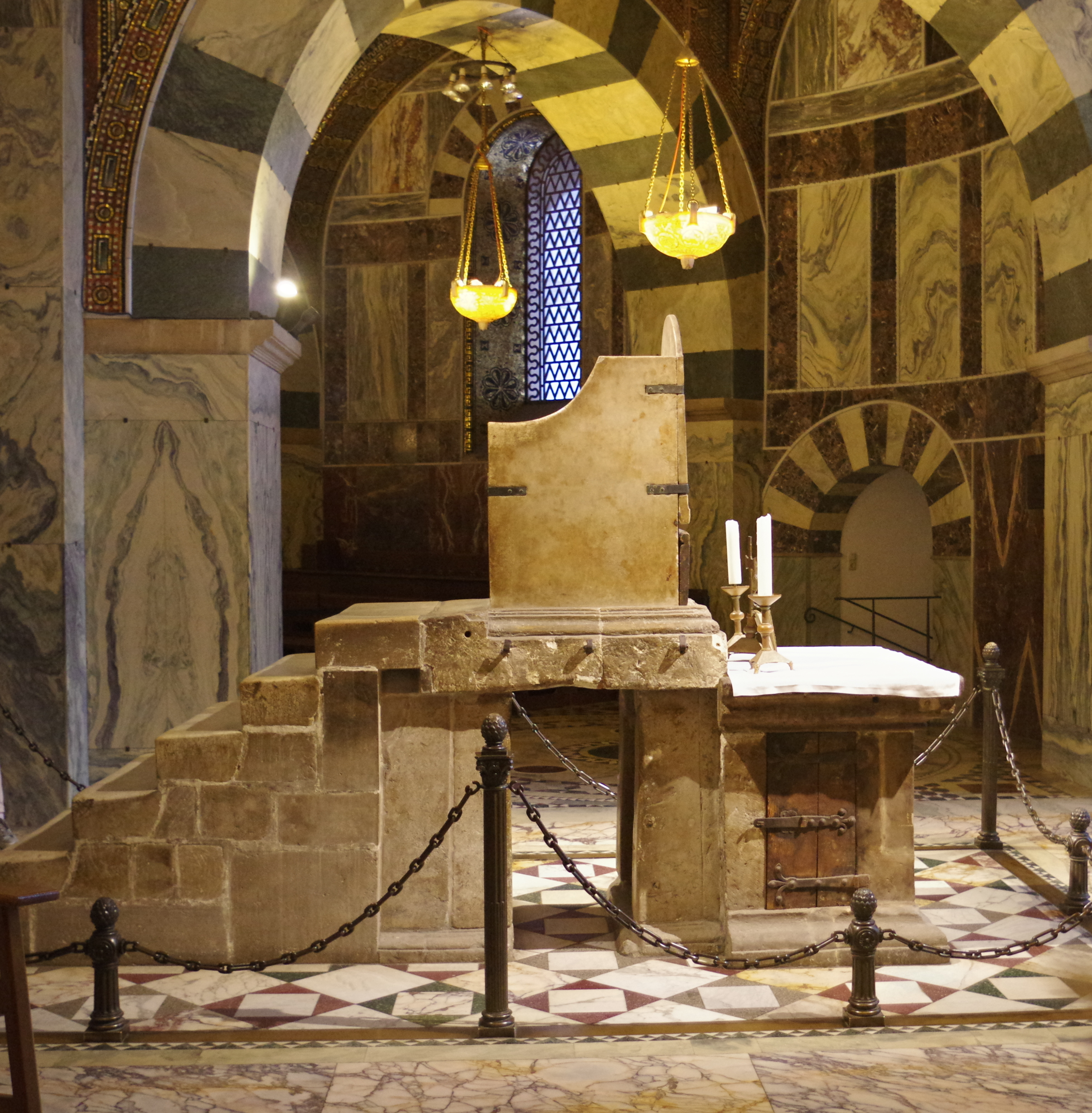
Throne of Charlemagne in the palace chapel

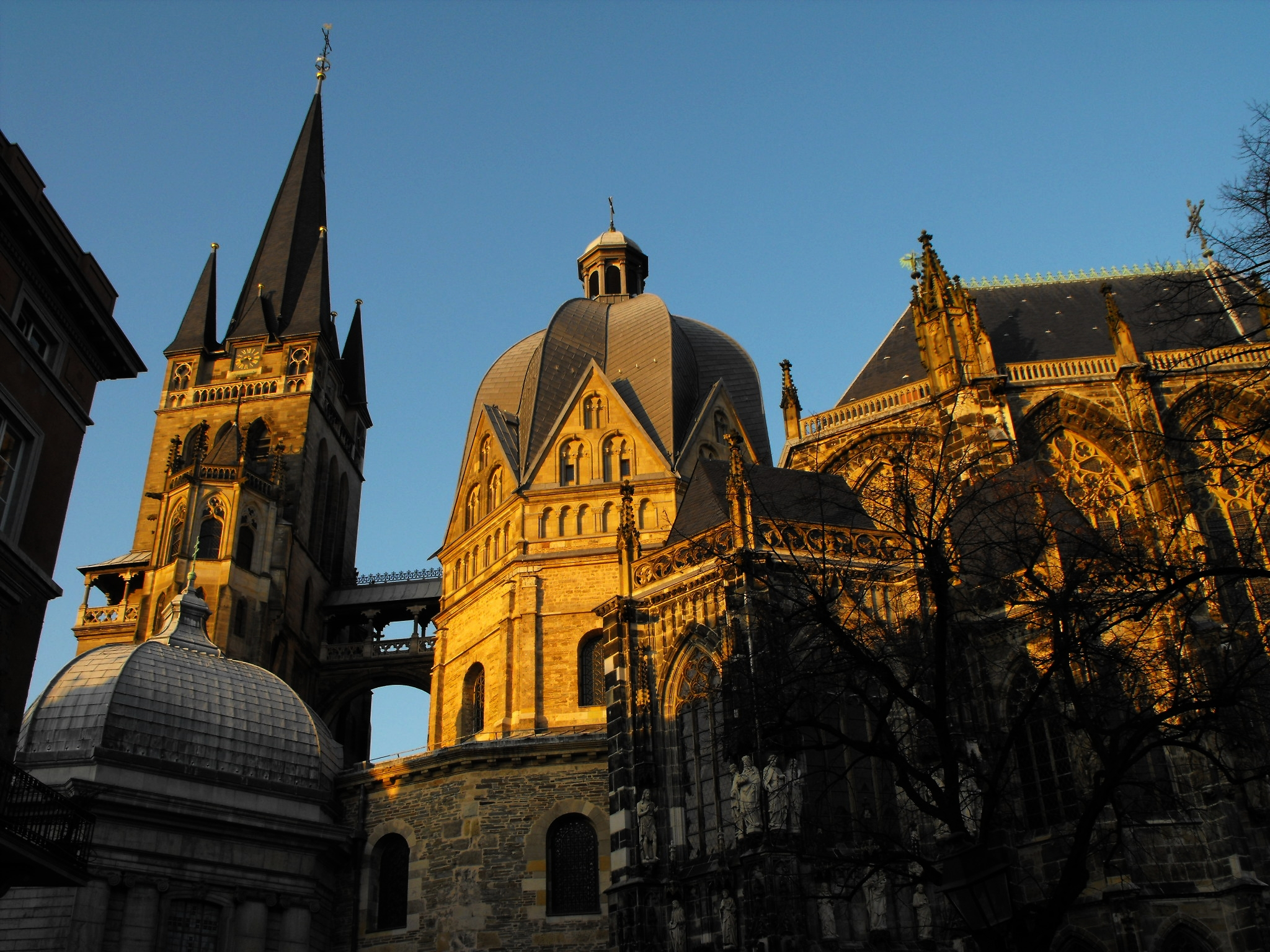
Sunset view of the Palatine Chapel

Charlemagne began the construction of the Palatine Chapel around 792, along with the building of the rest of the palace structures. It was consecrated in 805 by Pope Leo III in honour of the Virgin Mary. The building is a centrally planned, domed chapel. The east end had a square apse, and was originally flanked by two basilican structures, now lost but known through archaeology. The chapel was entered through a monumental atrium, to the west. The plan and decoration of the building combines elements of Classical, Byzantine and Pre-Romanesque, and opulent materials as the expression of a new royal house, ruled by Charlemagne.

The architect responsible, Odo of Metz, is named in a tenth century inscription around the dome: Insignem hanc dignitatis aulam Karolus caesar magnus instituit; egregius Odo magister explevit, Metensi fotus in urbe quiescit. Nothing more is known of him. The building he designed has a simple exterior and a complex interior, with a double shell octagonal dome resting on heavy piers, a two-story elevation, and elaborate revetment and decoration.

In 936 Otto I, the first Holy Roman Emperor of the Ottonian dynasty, took advantage of the chapel's close association with Charlemagne and held his coronation as King of Germany there. Holy Roman Emperors continued to be crowned in the Palatine Chapel until 1531. In 1000, in what was most likely a symbolic exhibition, Otto III placed the tomb of Charlemagne in the chapel and paid homage to his remains. The original tomb was probably a sepulchral niche, afterwards known as the "Karlsmemorie", but destroyed in 1788.

== Structure ==
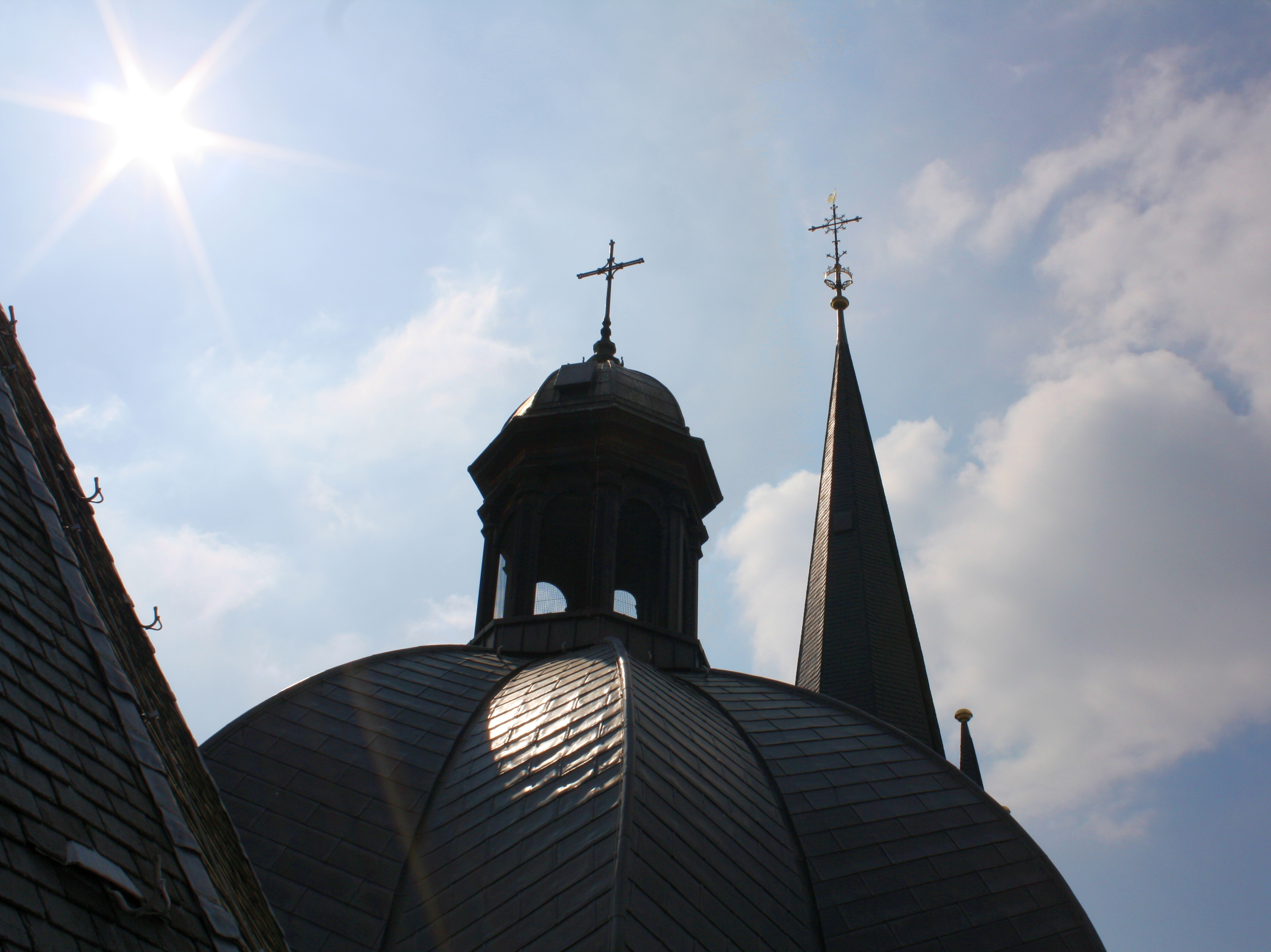
Sunlit dome of the Palatine Chapel at noonday

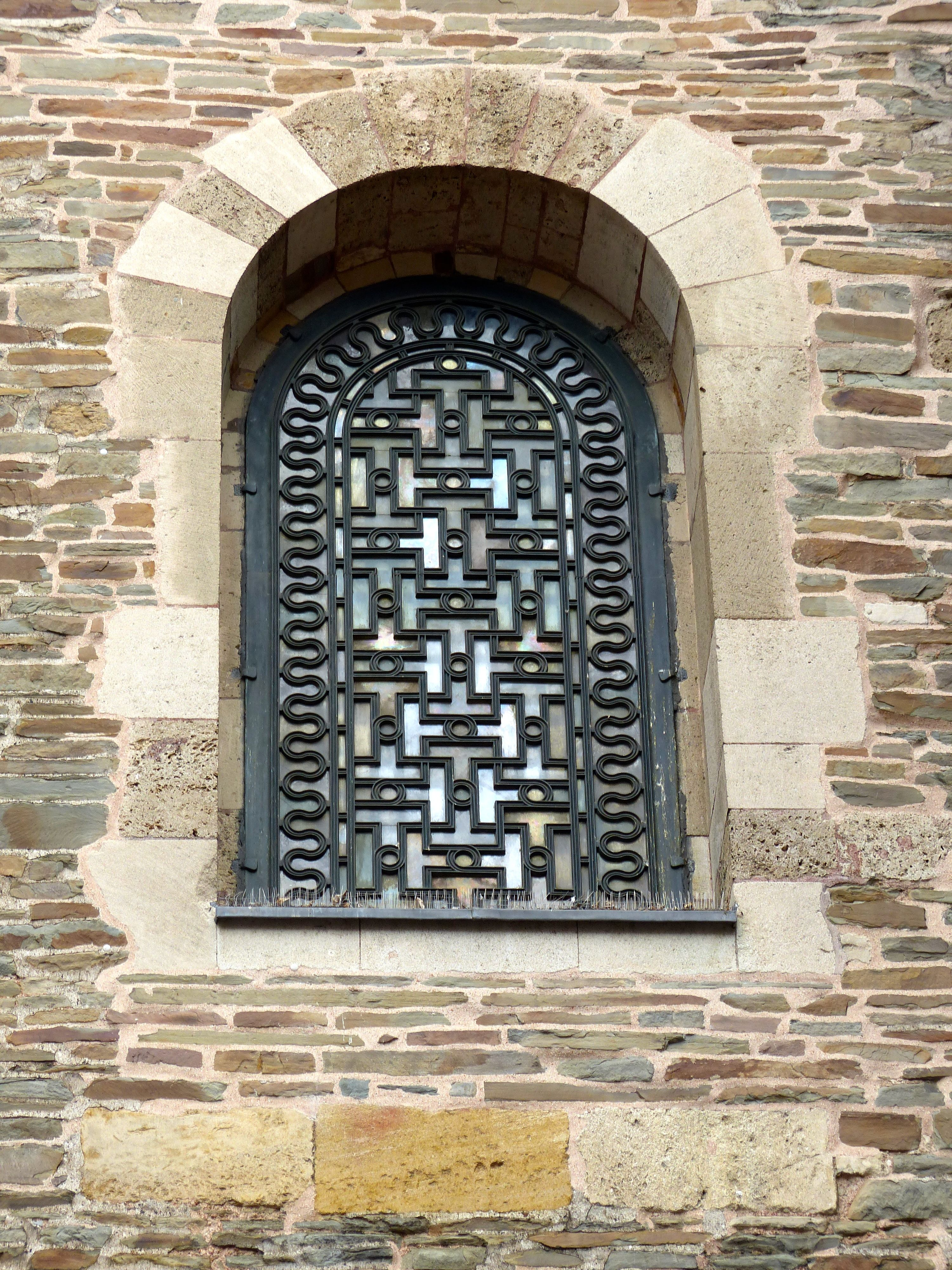
Detail of barred window of Palatine Chapel (exterior view)

Floor plan of Aachen Cathedral with Charlemagne's palace chapel highlighted in the center

There is a sixteen-sided ambulatory with a gallery overhead encircling the central octagonal dome. The plan and decoration owe much to the sixth-century Basilica of San Vitale, Ravenna. Indeed, Charlemagne visited Ravenna three times, the first in 787. In that year he wrote to Pope Hadrian I and requested "mosaic, marbles, and other materials from floors and walls" in Rome and Ravenna, for his palace.

The construction, including barrel and groin vaults and an octagonal cloister-vault in the dome, reflects late Roman, or Pre-Romanesque, practices rather than the Byzantine techniques employed at San Vitale, and its plan simplifies the complex geometry of the Ravenna building. Multi-coloured marble veneer is used to create a sumptuous interior. The chapel makes use of ancient spolia, conceivably from Ravenna (Einhard claimed they were from Rome and Ravenna), as well as newly carved materials. The bronze decoration is of extraordinarily high quality, especially the doors with lions heads and the interior railings, with their Corinthian order columns and acanthus scrolls.

The Aachen Royal complex (English subtitles)

The dome was decorated originally with a fresco, and later with mosaic. In the Baroque period, it was replaced by stucco. The original mosaic was reproduced in the 19th century with the same iconography as the original. It depicts the twenty-four elders of the Apocalypse bearing crowns and standing around the base of the dome. Above the main altar, and facing the royal throne, is an image of Christ in Majesty. The upper gallery of the chapel was the royal space, with a special throne area for the king, then emperor, which let onto the liturgical space of the church and onto the atrium outside as well.

The inscription above the ground floor archer reads: "CUM LAPIDES VIVI PACIS CONPAGE LIGANTUR INQUE PARES NUMEROS OMNIA CONVENIENT CLARET OPUS DOMINI, TOTAM QUI CONSTRUIT AULAM EFFECTUSQUE PIIS DAT STUDIIS HOMINUM QUORUM PERFECTUI DECORIS STRUCTURA MANEBIT SI PERFECTA AUCTOR PROTEGAT ATQUE REGAT SIC DEUS HOC TUTUM STABILI FUNDAMINE TEMPLUM QUOD PRINCEPS CAROLUS CONDIDIT ESSE VELIT".

The main entrance is dominated by a westwork comprising the western facade including the entrance vestibule, rooms at one or more levels above, and one or more towers. These overlook the atrium of the church. The addition of a westwork to churches is one of the Carolingian contributions to Western architectural traditions.

The bronze doors symbolize the Carolingian Renaissance in metalwork, on a scale not seen since the Roman Empire.

== Gallery ==
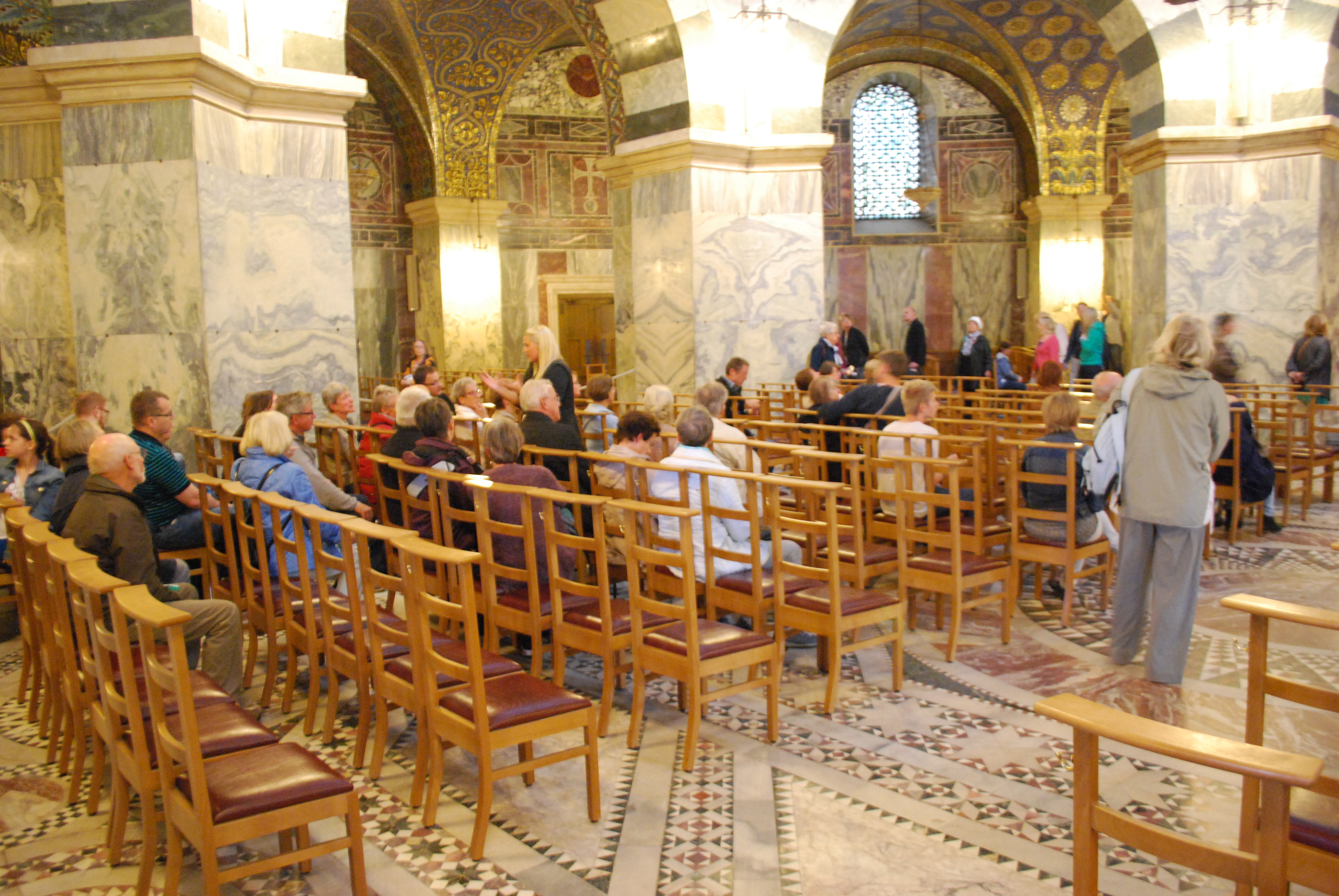
Seating arrangements on individual oak chairs

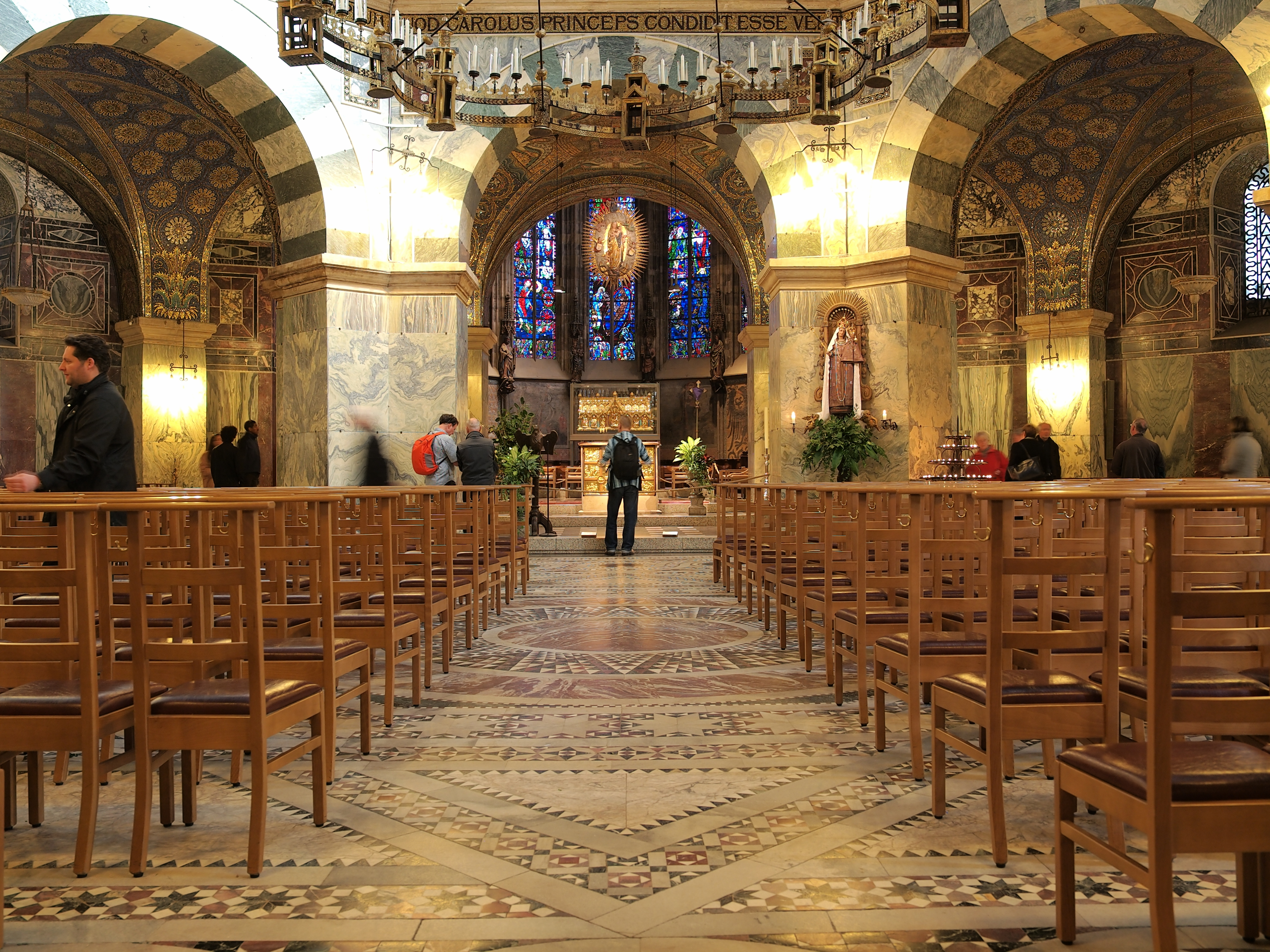
View up the nave

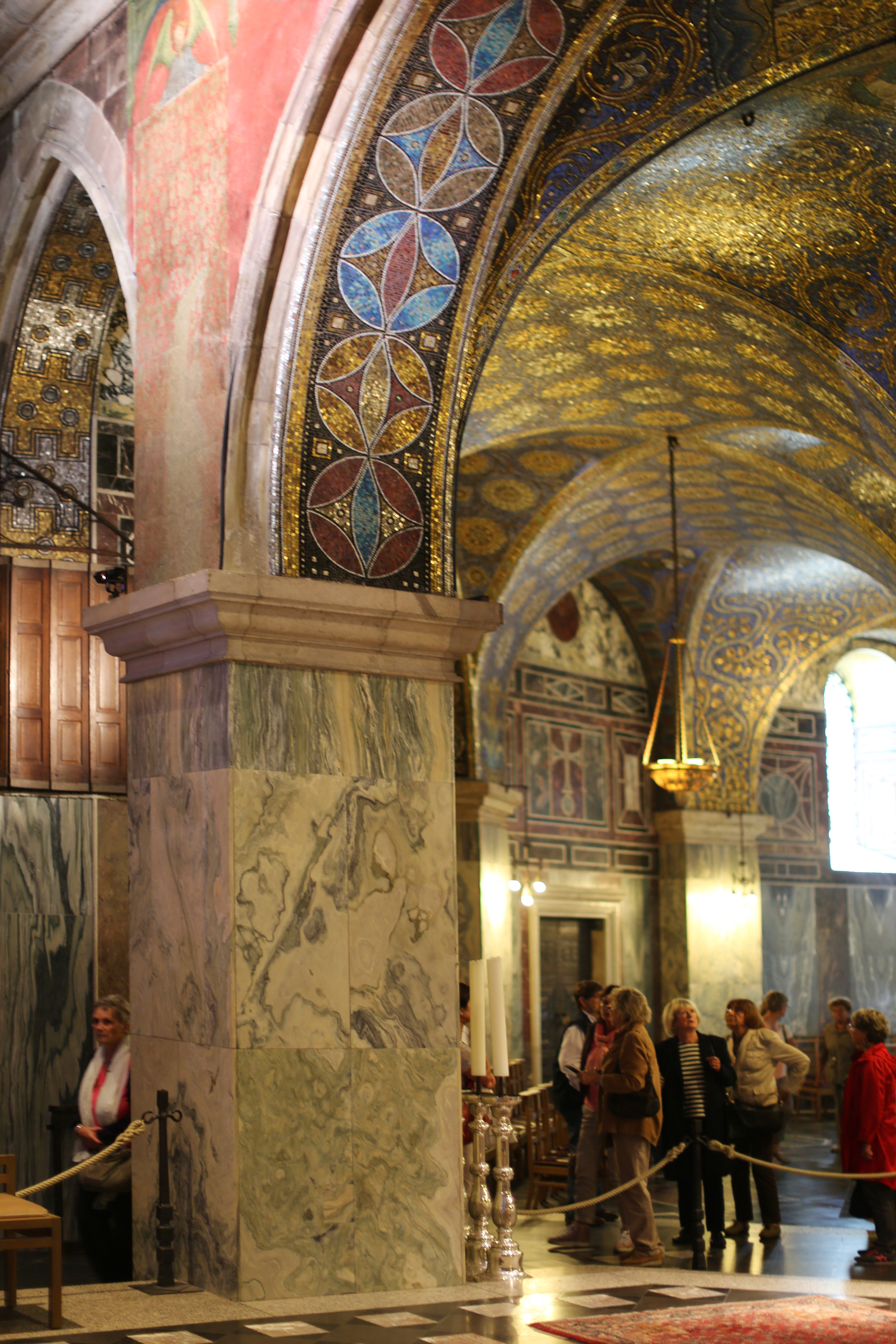
Detail of marble-clad pillar

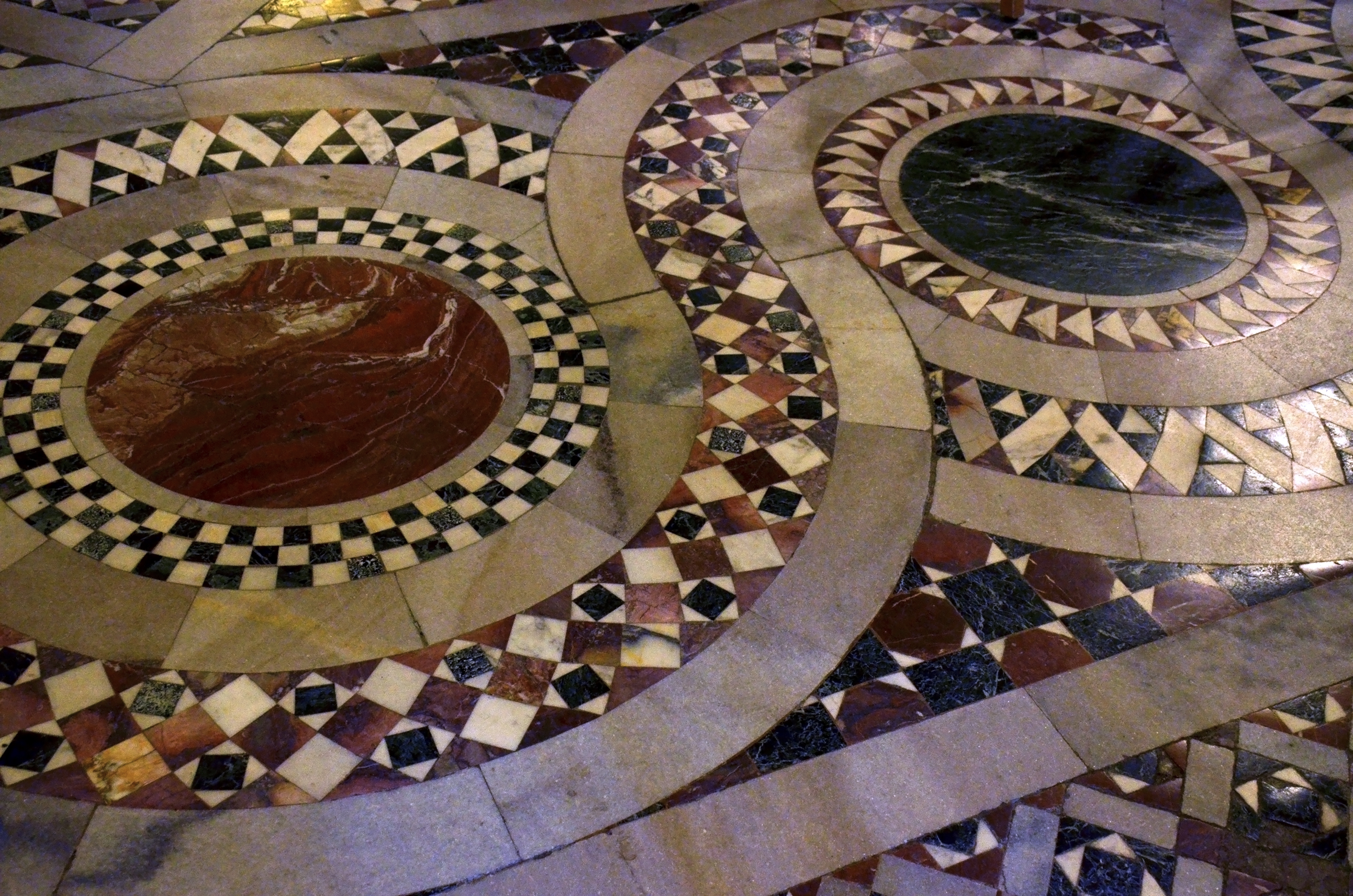
Detail of inlaid floor

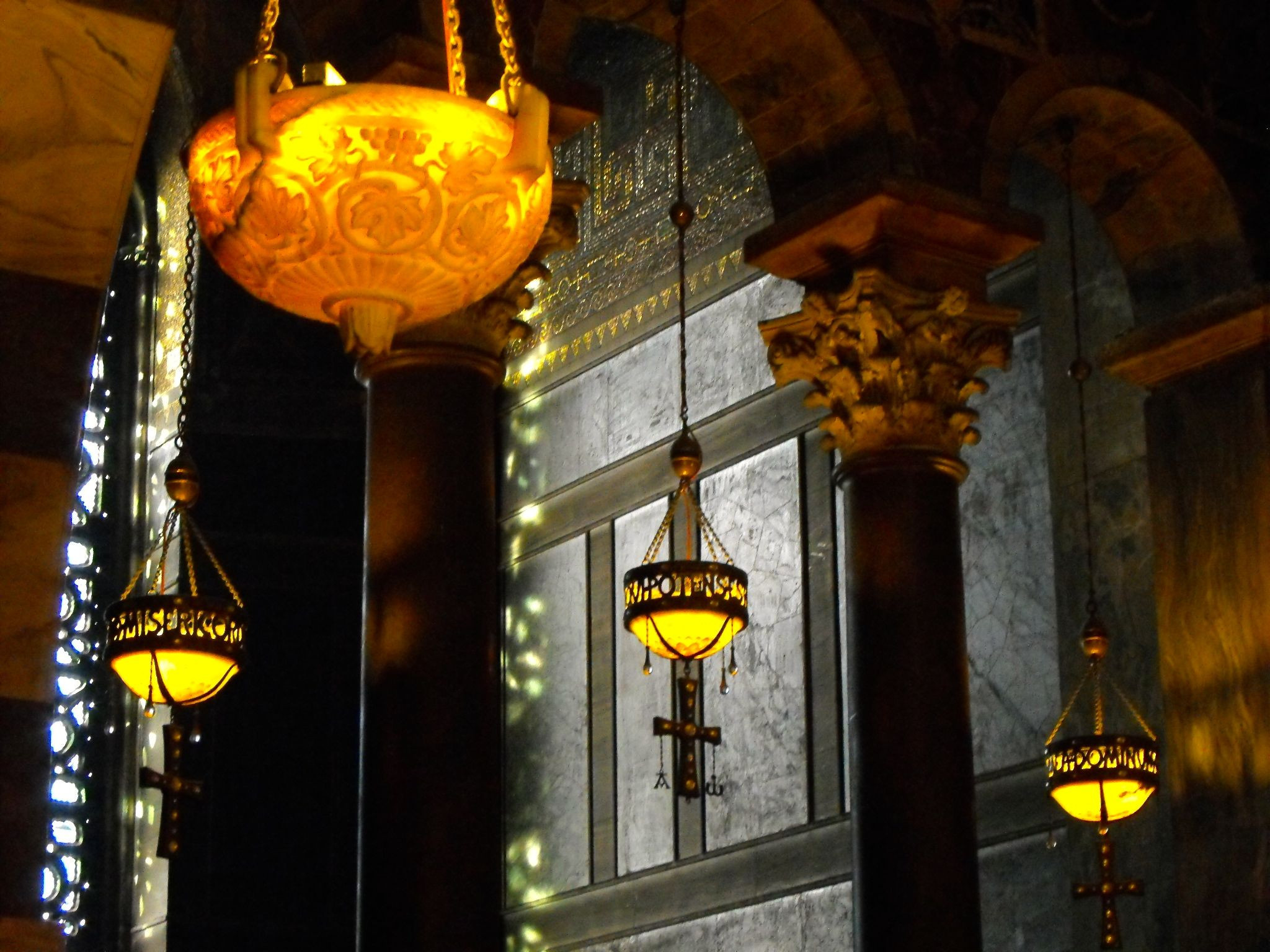
Lights and details of chapiter

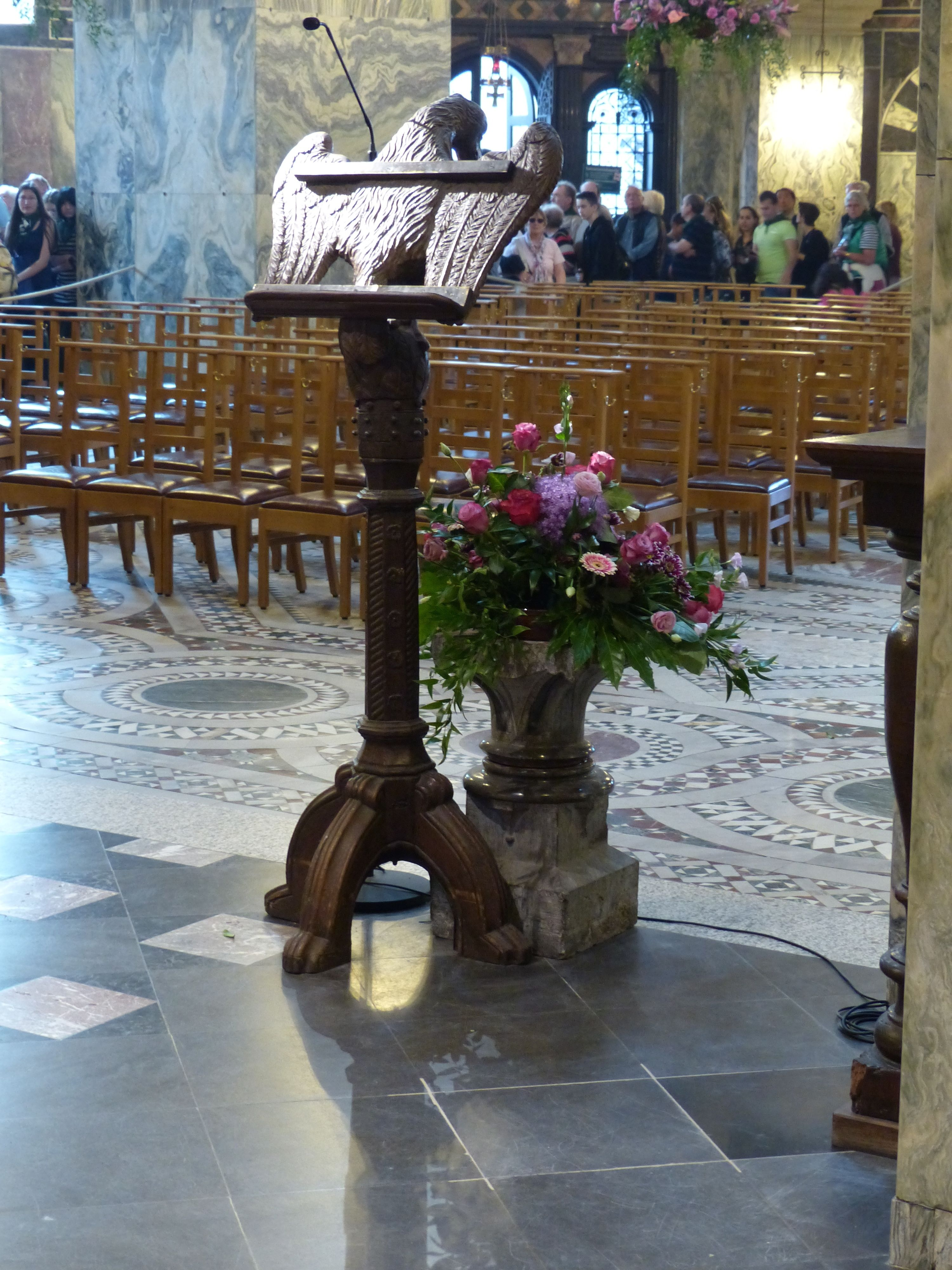
Lectern bookrest in the form of an eagle

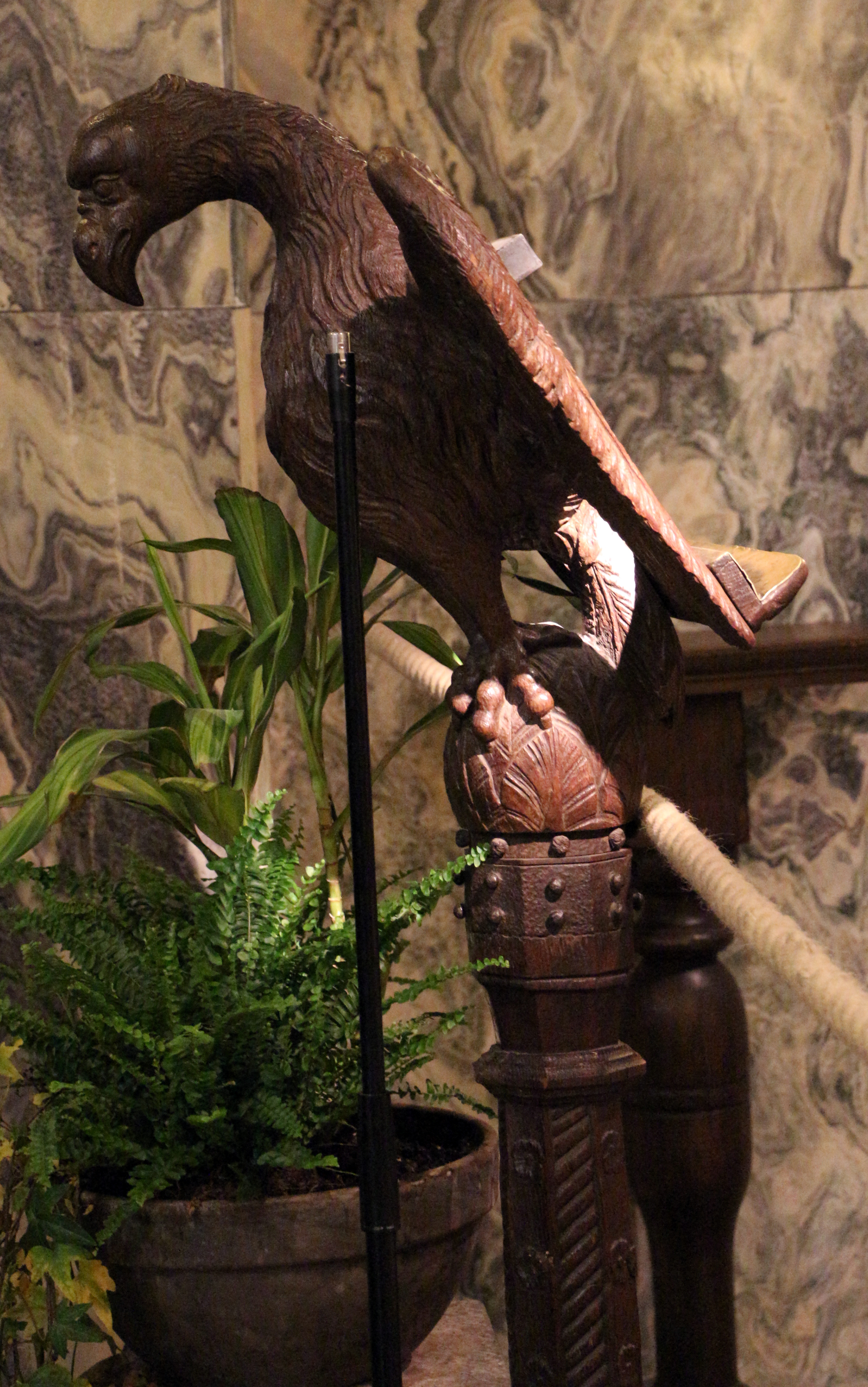
Side view of lectern eagle

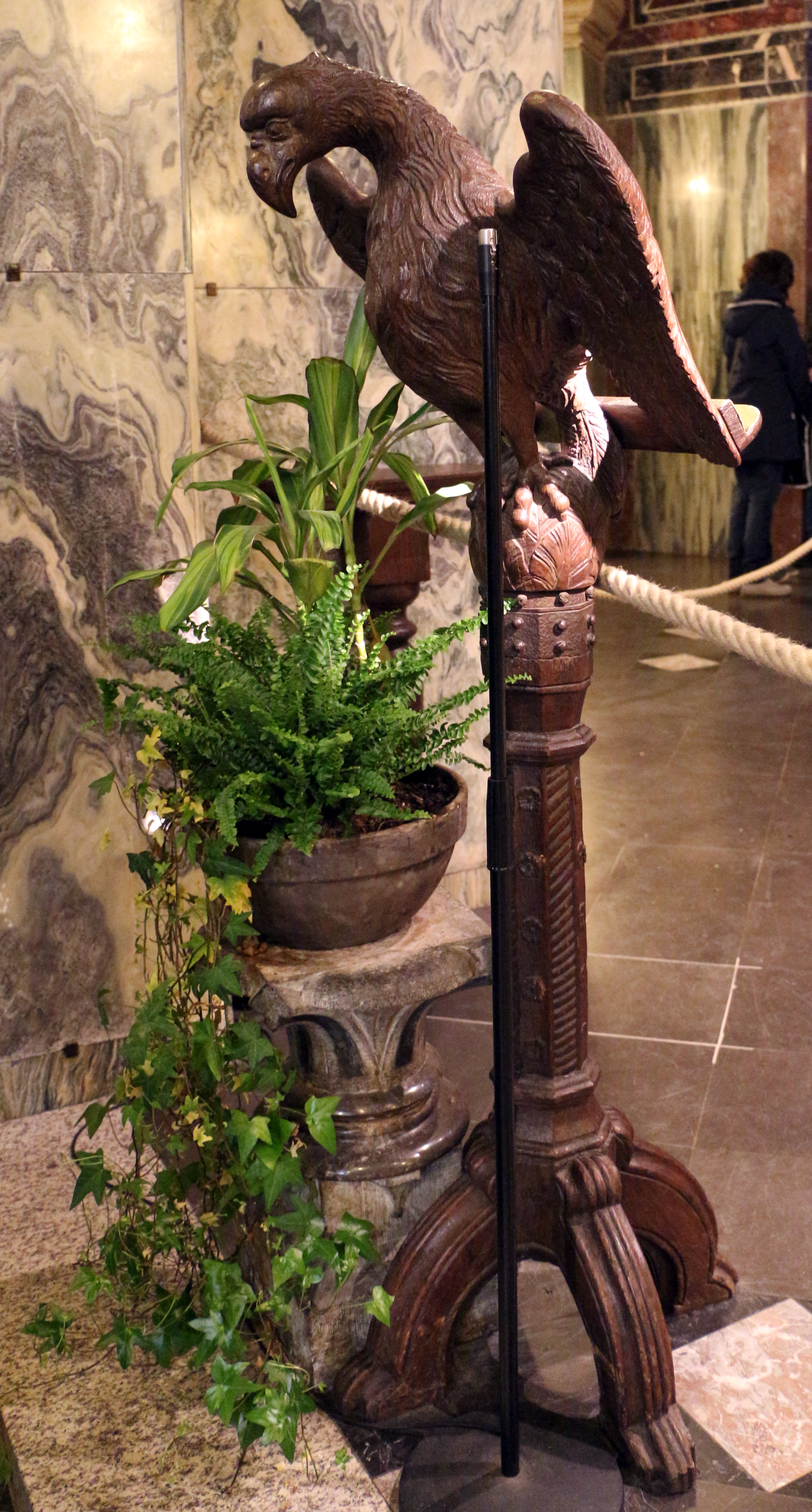
Front 3/4 view of lectern eagle

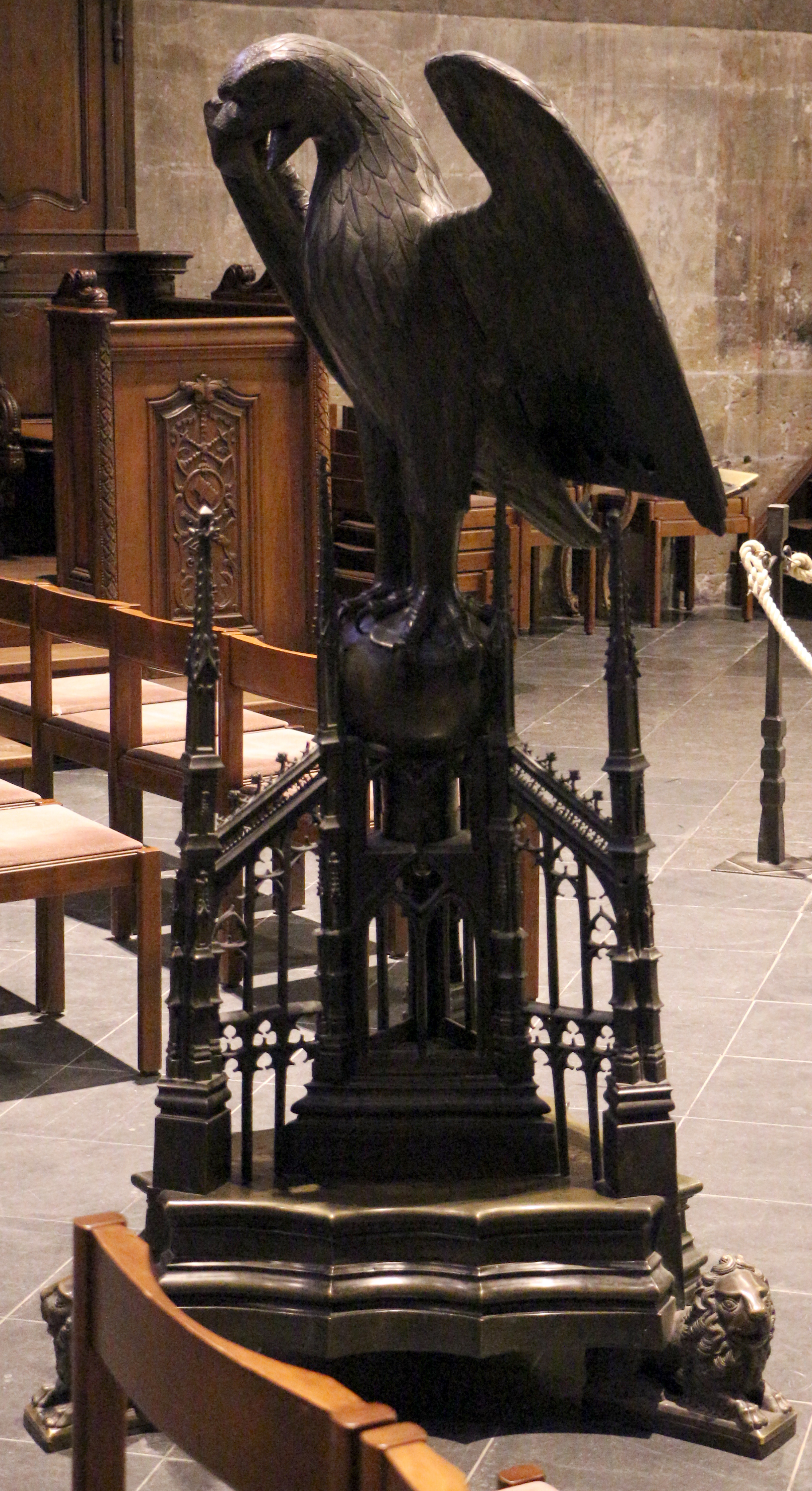
Choirmaster badalone in form of eagle

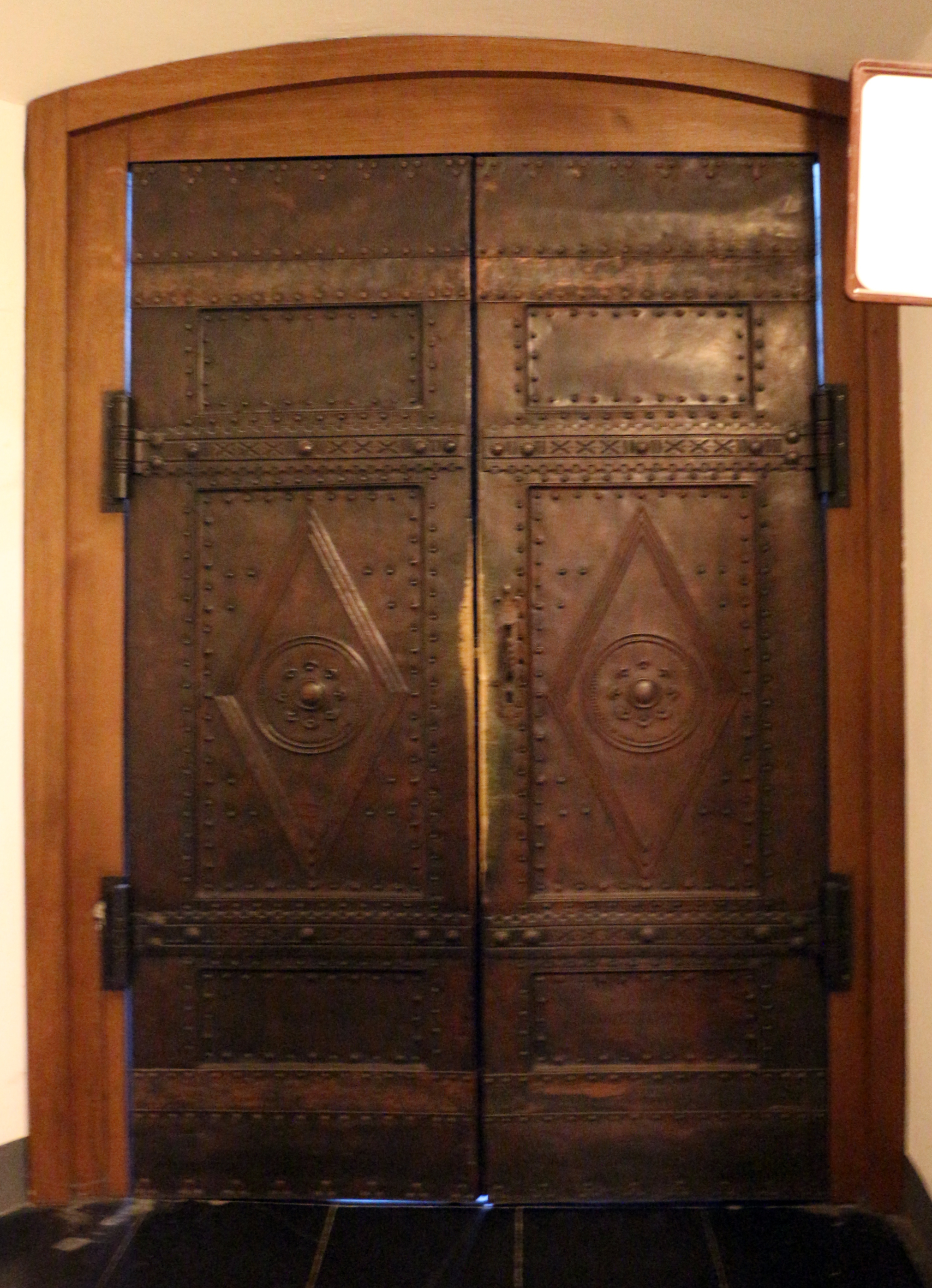
Bronze-clad central doors

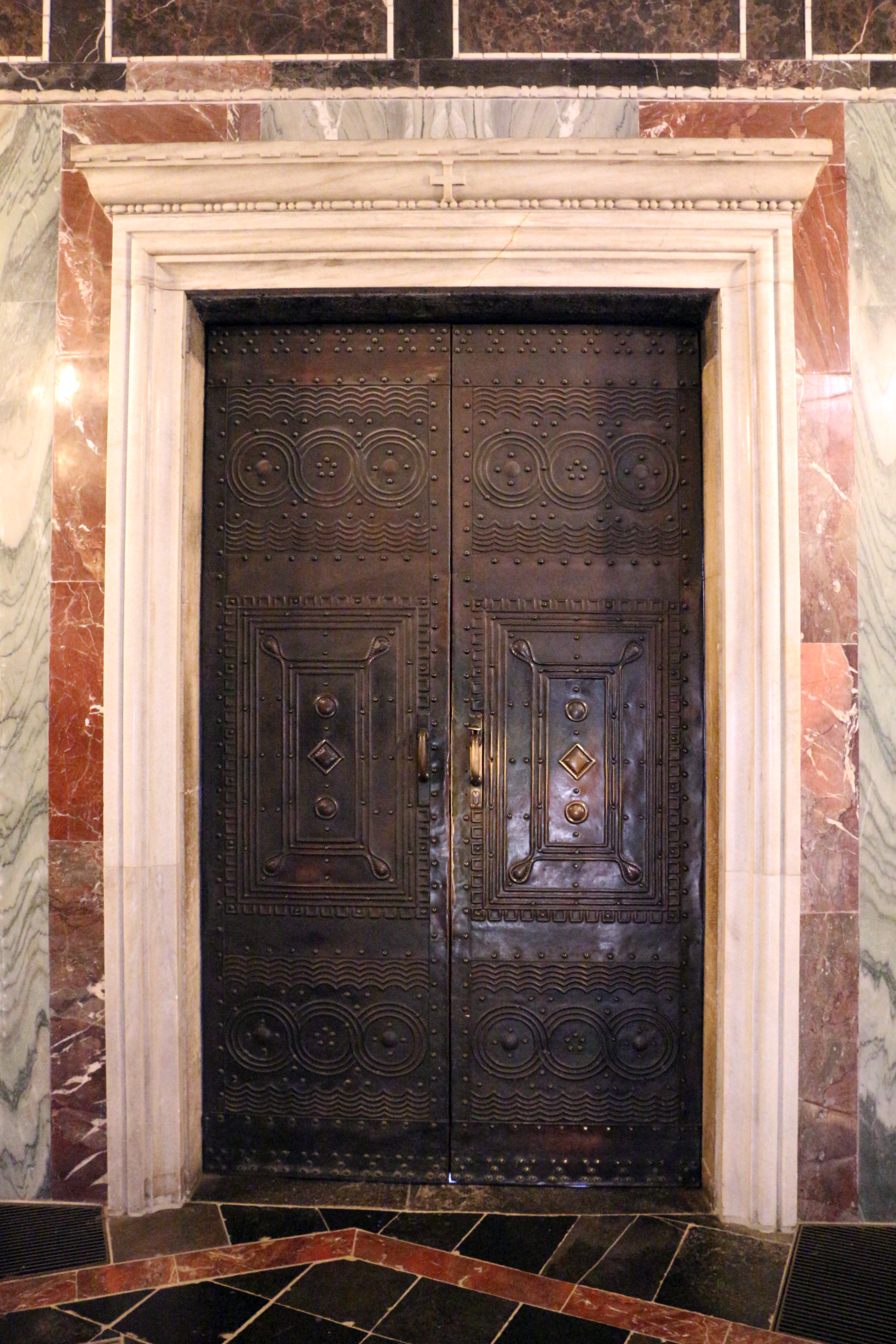
Bronze-clad crypt door

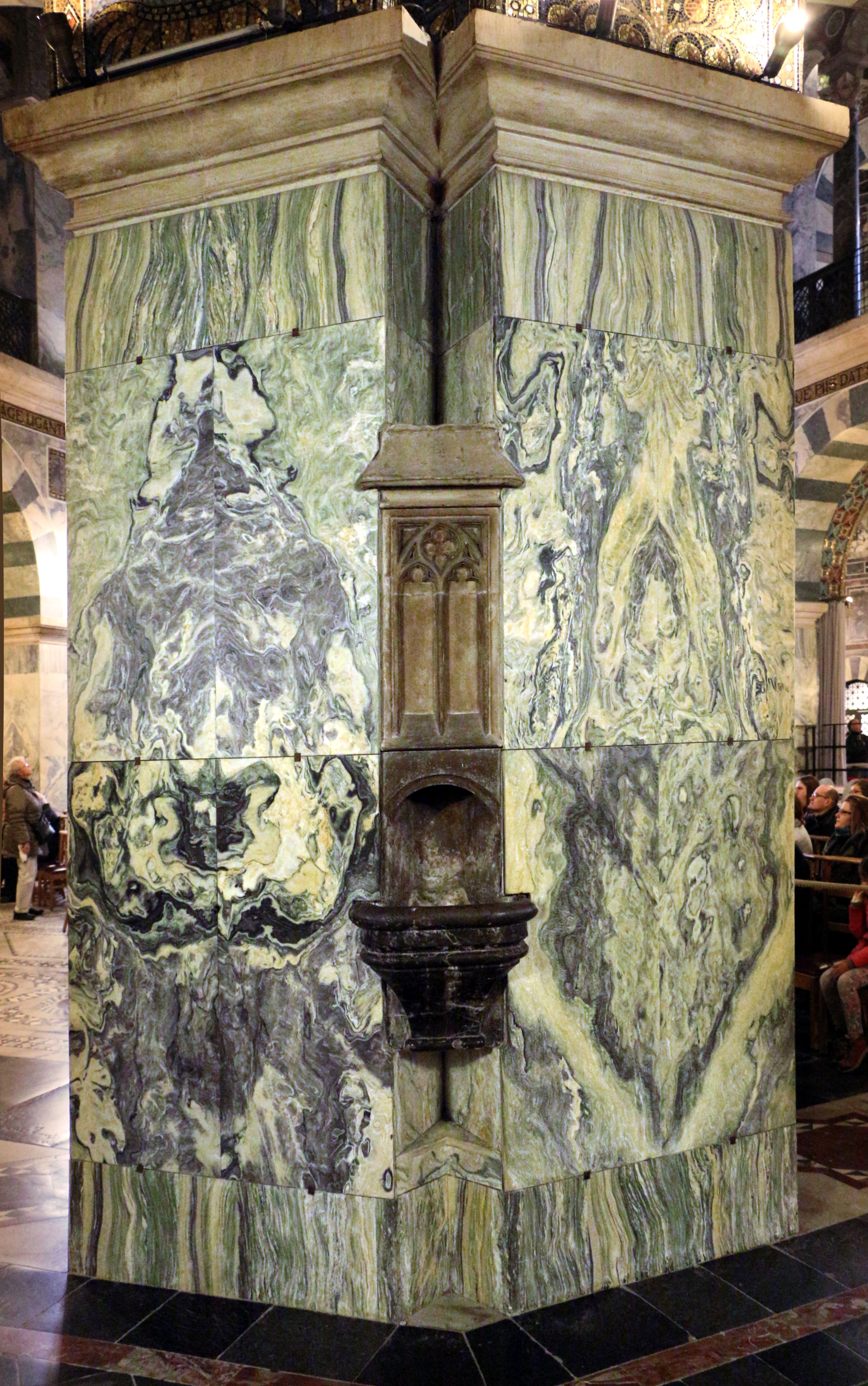
Marble-clad column

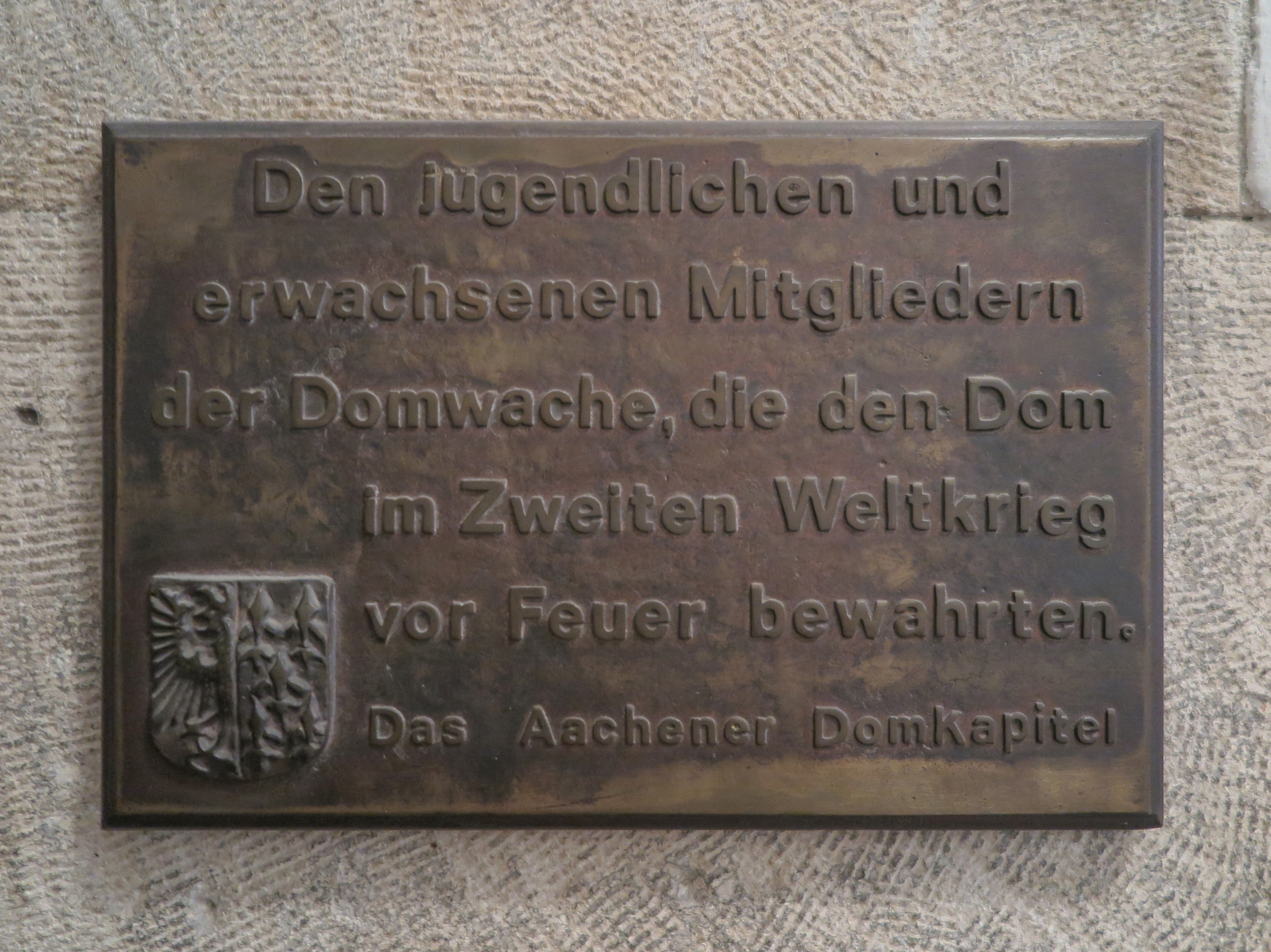
World War II memorial plaque

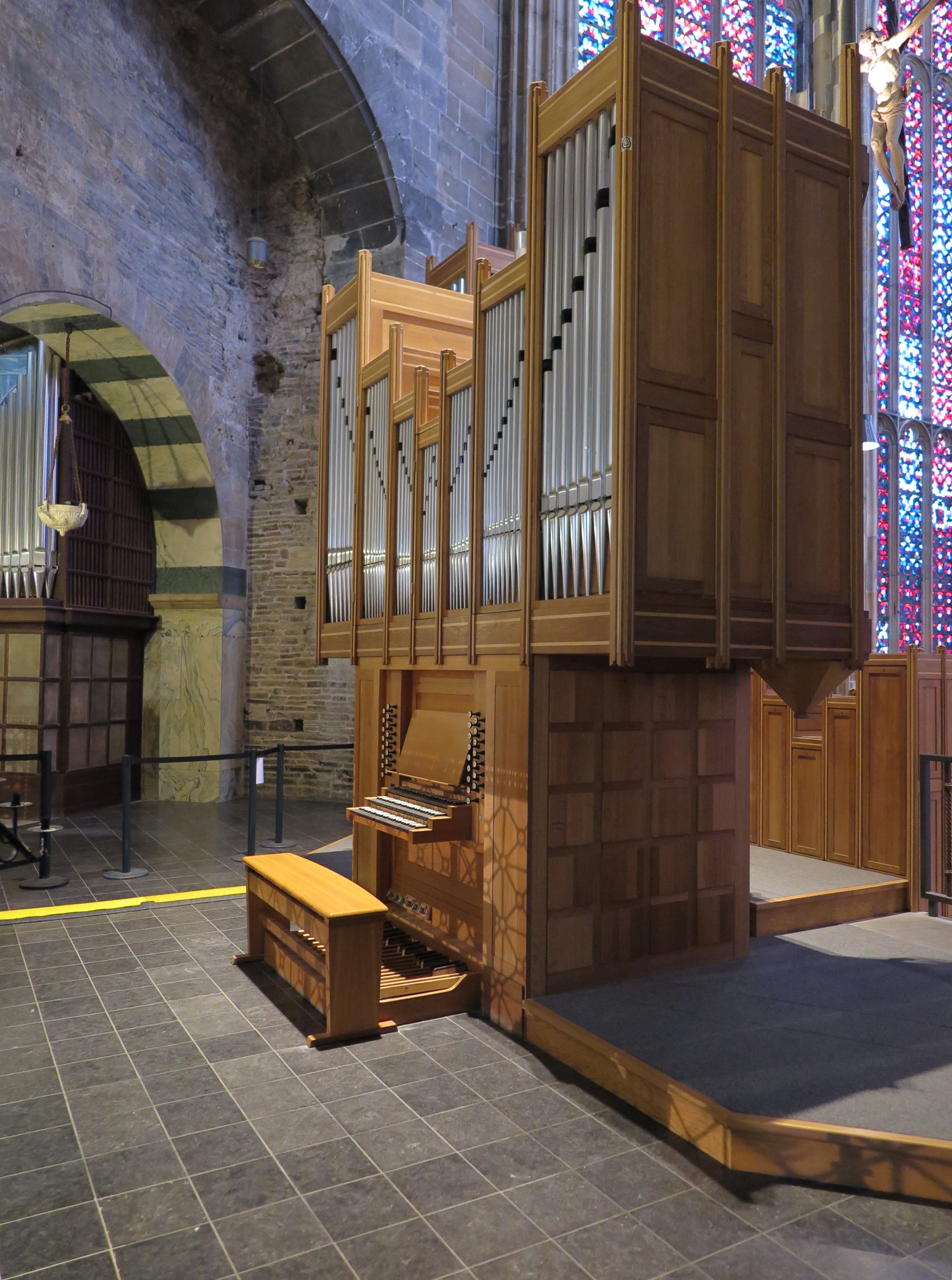
Pipe organ

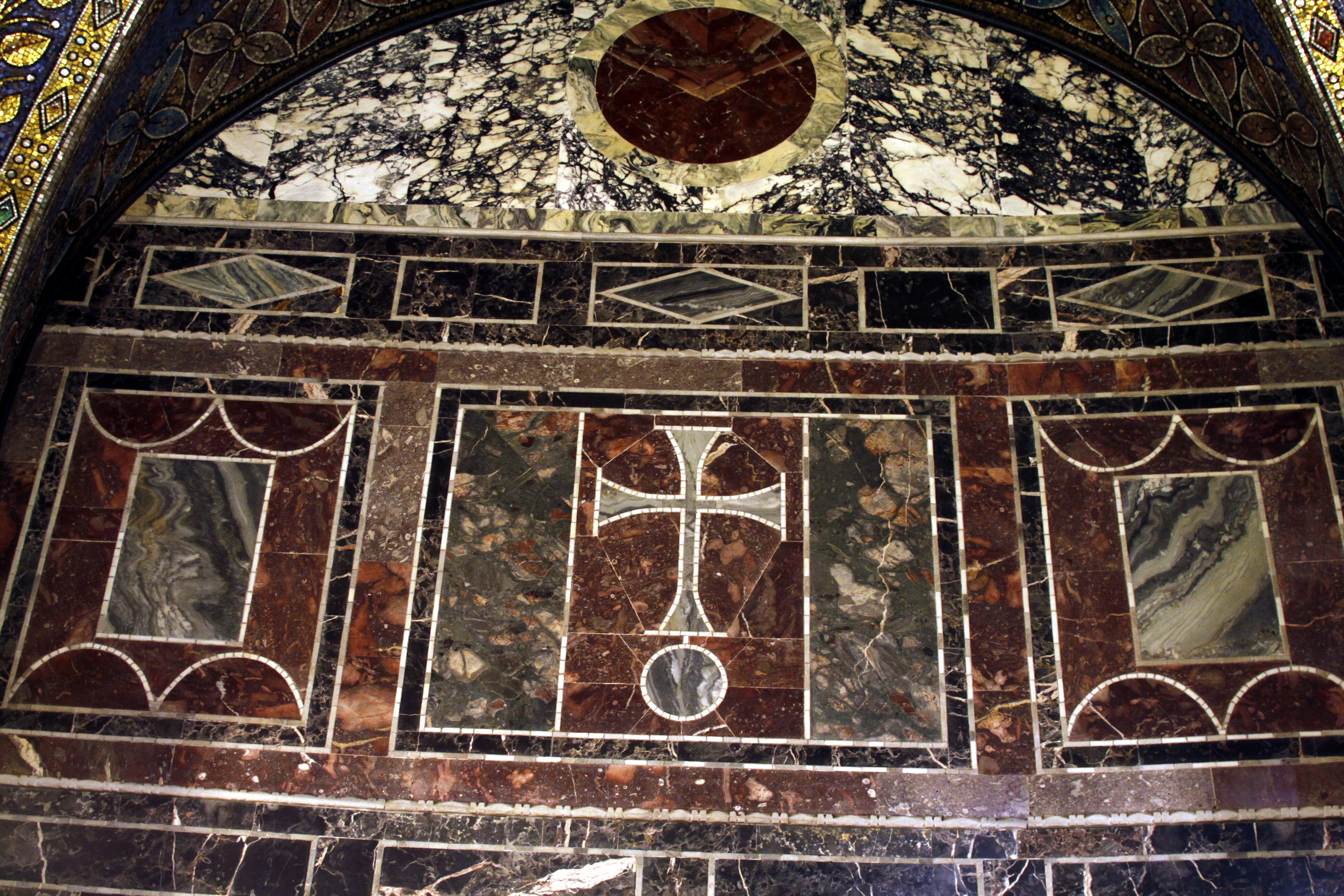
Marble wall

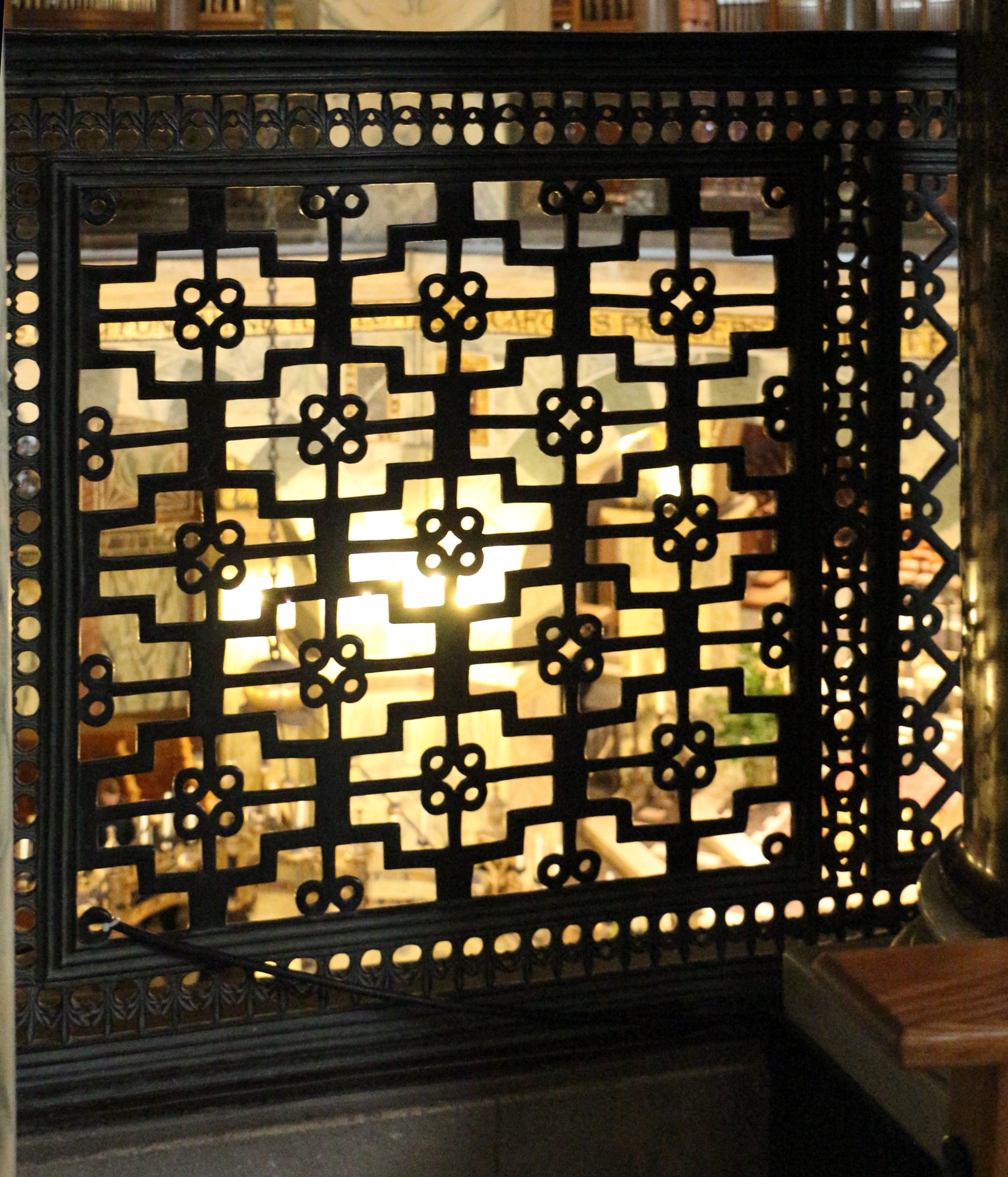
Metalwork grate

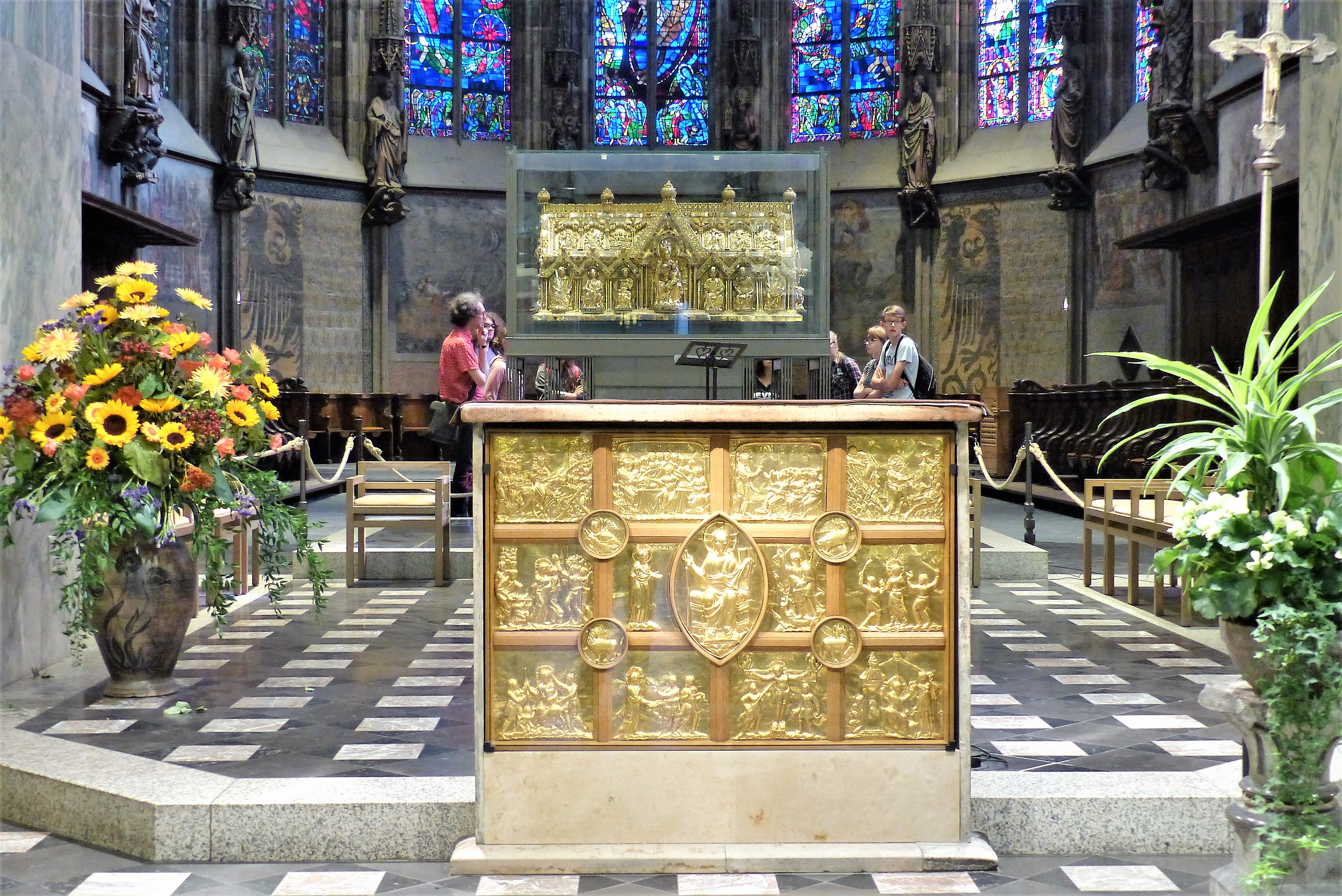
Main altar

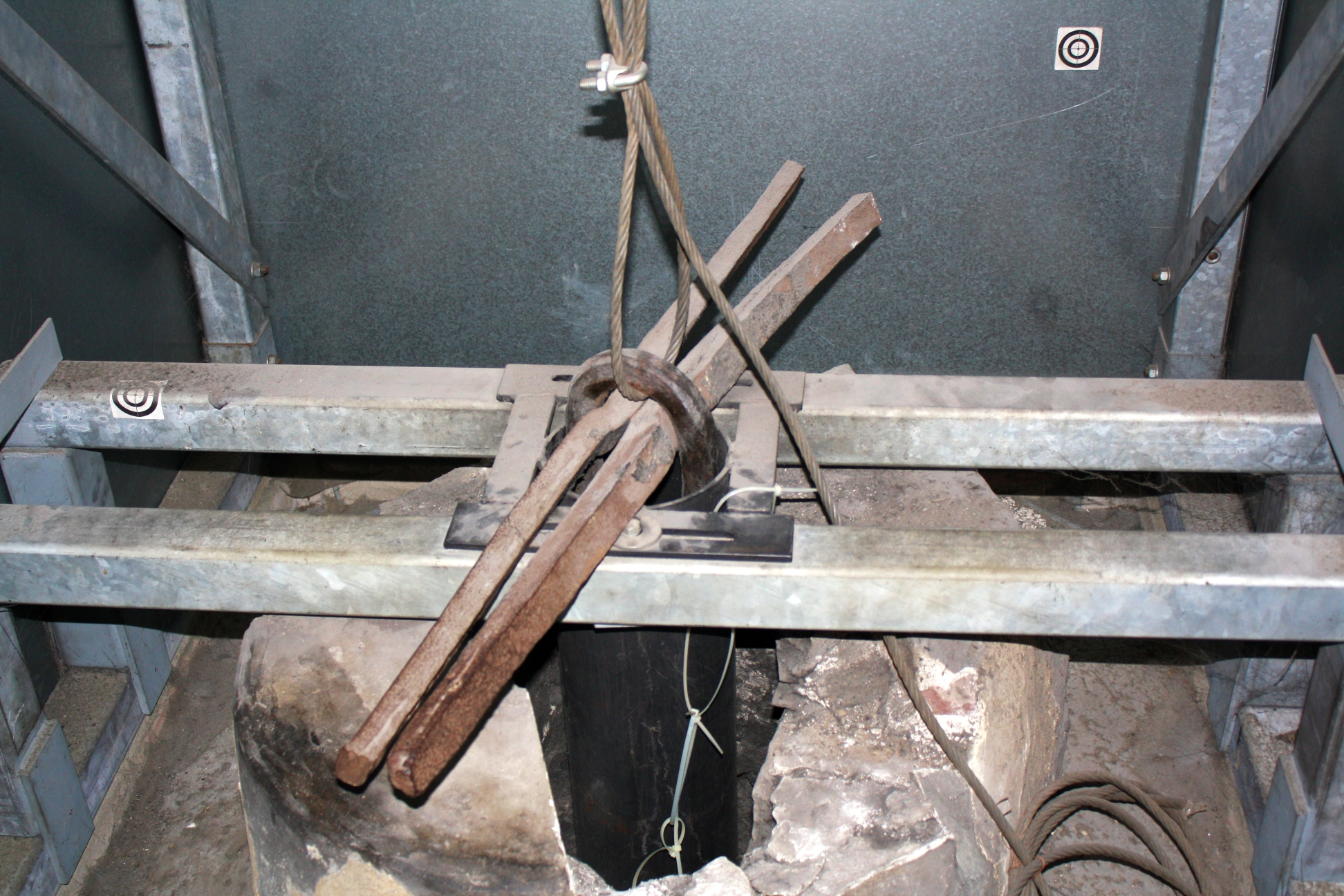
Mounting for the Barbarossa Chandelier

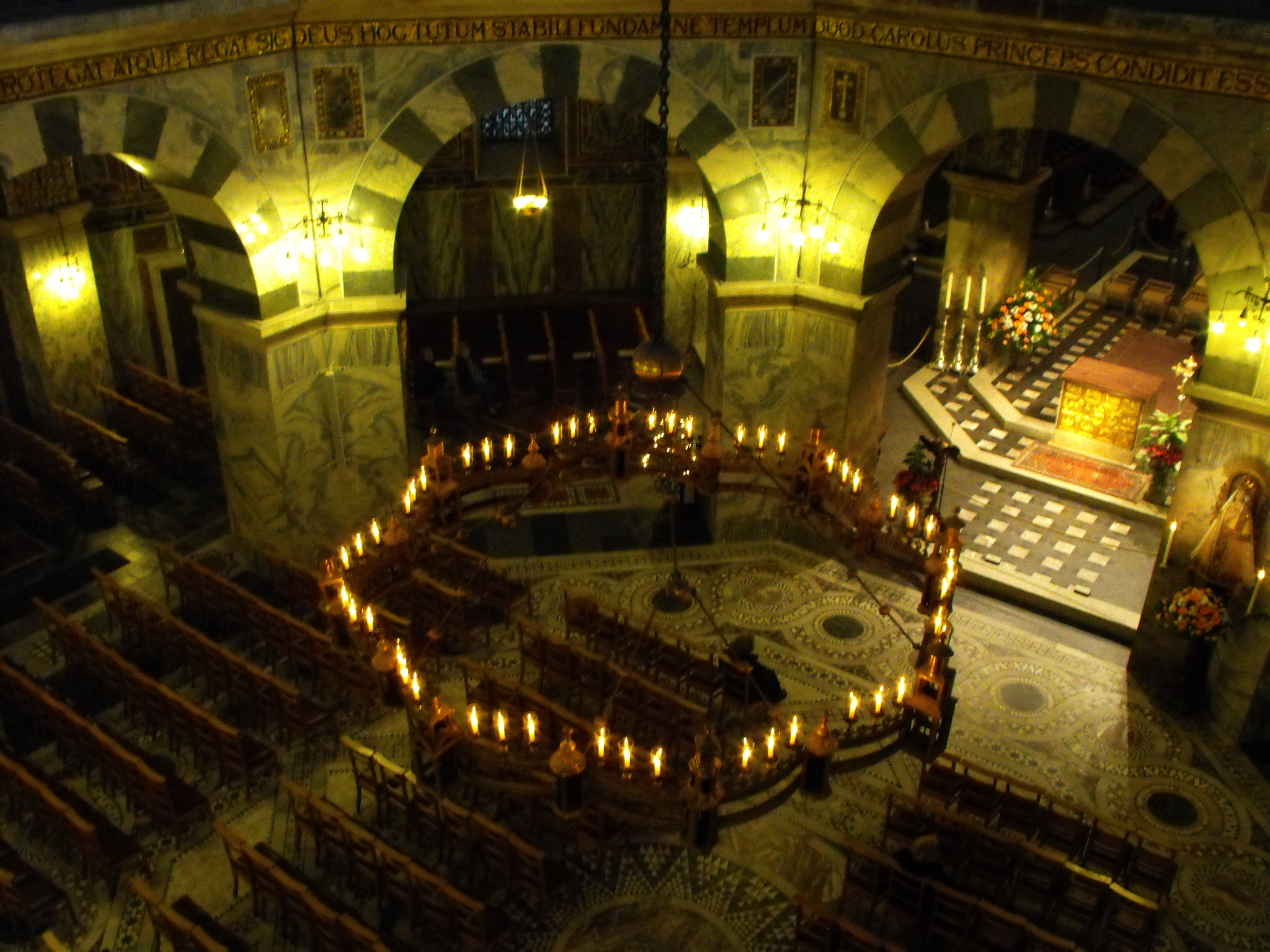
Wheel chandelier attributed to Frederick Barbarossa, night view from above

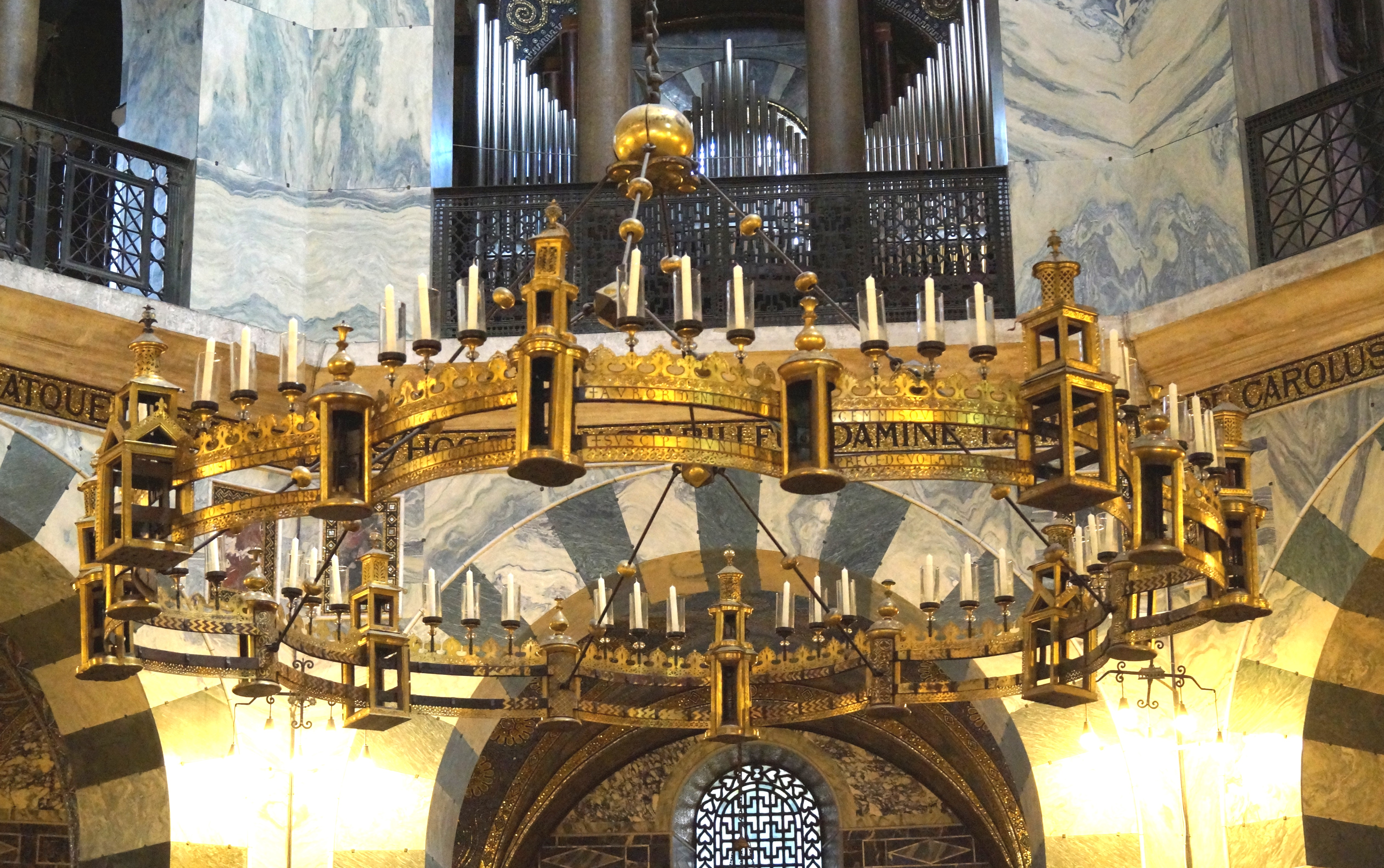
Wheel chandelier, daylight from below

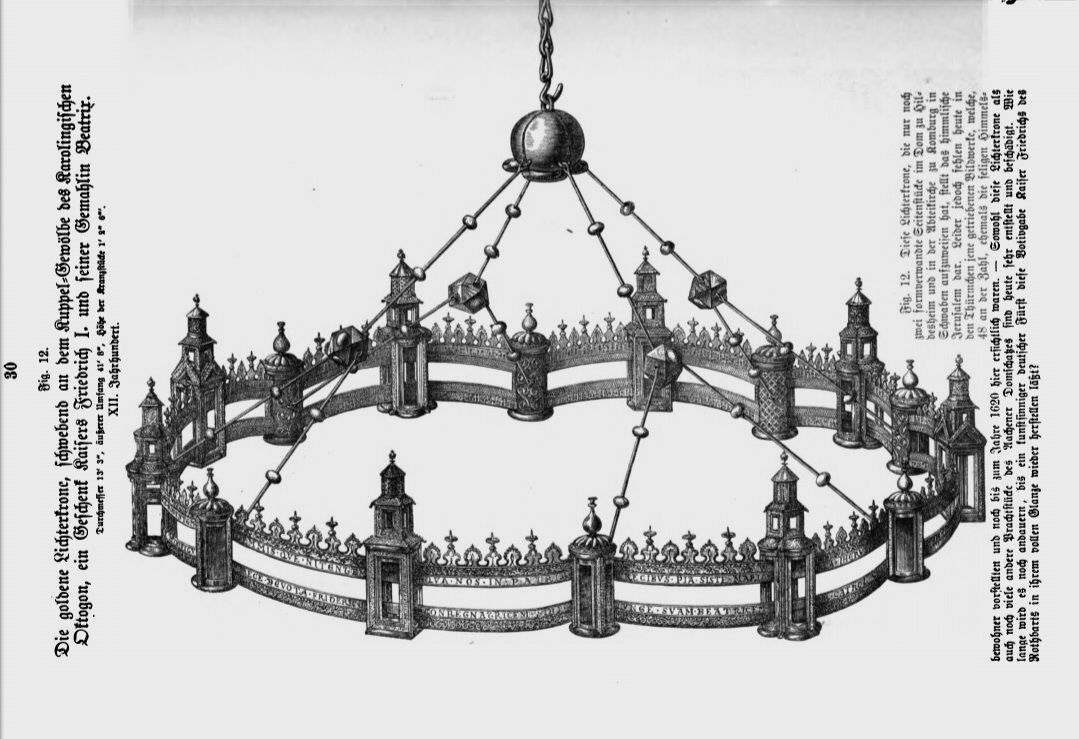
Artistic drawing of wheel chandelier

== See also ==
- Aachen penny of Charlemagne
- Carolingian architecture
- Early medieval domes
- Symbolism of domes
