= Saint-Martin-lès-Melle =

- Part of Melle
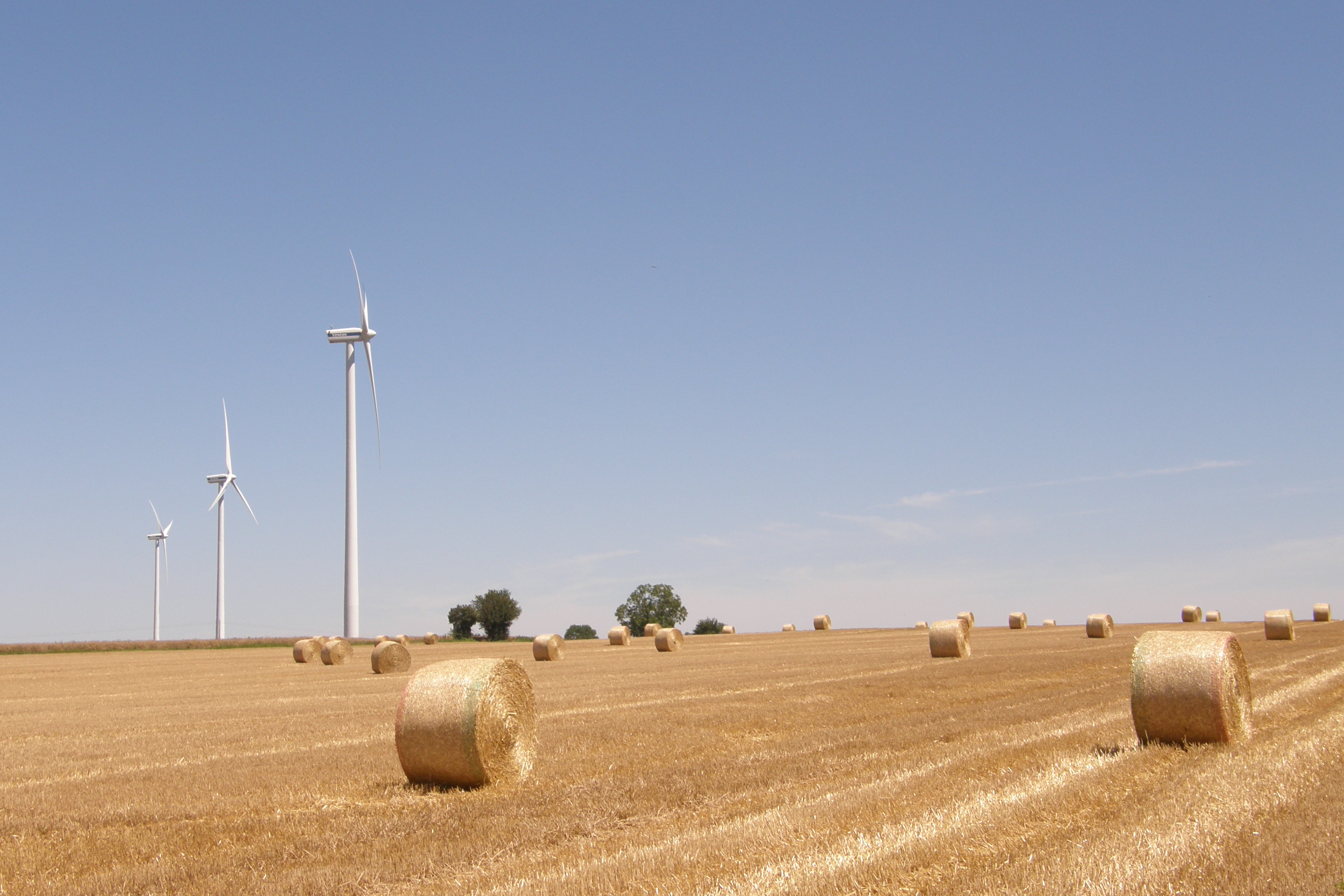
- The landscape in Saint-Martin-lès-Melle
- Location of Saint-Martin-lès-Melle
- Location within France Location within Nouvelle-Aquitaine
- Coordinates: 46°13′18″N 0°09′50″W
- Country: France
- Region: Nouvelle-Aquitaine
- Department: Deux-Sèvres
- Arrondissement: Niort
- Canton: Melle
- Commune: Melle
- Area^{1}: 9.16 km^{2} (3.54 sq mi)
- Elevation: 200 m (660 ft)
- Highest elevation: 152 m (499 ft)
- Lowest elevation: 80 m (260 ft)
- Population (2022): 728
  - Density: 79.5/km^{2} (206/sq mi)
- Time zone: UTC+01:00 (CET)
  - Summer (DST): UTC+02:00 (CEST)
- Postal code: 79500
- ^{1} French Land Register data, which excludes lakes, ponds, glaciers > 1 km^{2} (0.386 sq mi or 247 acres) and river estuaries.

Saint-Martin-lès-Melle (French pronunciation: [sɛ̃ maʁtɛ̃ lɛ mɛl], literally Saint-Martin near Melle) is a former commune in the Deux-Sèvres department in western France. On 1 January 2019, it was merged into the commune Melle.

== See also ==
- Communes of the Deux-Sèvres department
