= Hervé de La Martinière =

French businessman and publisher (1947–2025)

- Born: Hervé Machet de La Martinière; 1 February 1947; Courbevoie, France
- Died: 8 May 2025 (aged 78); Paris, France
- Occupations: Businessman; publisher

Hervé Machet de La Martinière (French: [ɛʁve maʃɛ də la maʁtinjɛʁ]; 1 February 1947 – 8 May 2025) was a French businessman and publisher. He founded La Martinière Groupe and played important roles in six other French publishing groups.

== Life and career ==
Born in Courbevoie on 1 February 1947, La Martinière was self-taught in the world of publishing group management. He notably started with Hachette Livre before serving as commercial director of Éditions Grasset, Fayard, and Éditions du Chêne. From 1987 to 1991, he was director-general of Nathan. In 1991, he founded La Martinière Groupe and notably acquired La Martinière jeunesse and Diff Edit. In 1997, the group acquired Abrams Books, which was worth over 350 million francs, thanks to profits from Alain and Gérard Wertheimer and Knesebeck Verlag. In 2004, he oversaw the acquisition of Éditions du Seuil, bringing with it Éditions de l'Olivier, Éditions Baleine, Éditions Points, and Petit à petit.

In September 2017, La Martinière announced that his publishing group intended to merge with Média-Participations. On 30 January 2018, he was named Vice-President of the new group, which was led by Vincent Montagne.

Hervé de La Martinière died in Paris on 8 May 2025, at the age of 78.
