= Paizay-le-Tort =

- Part of Melle
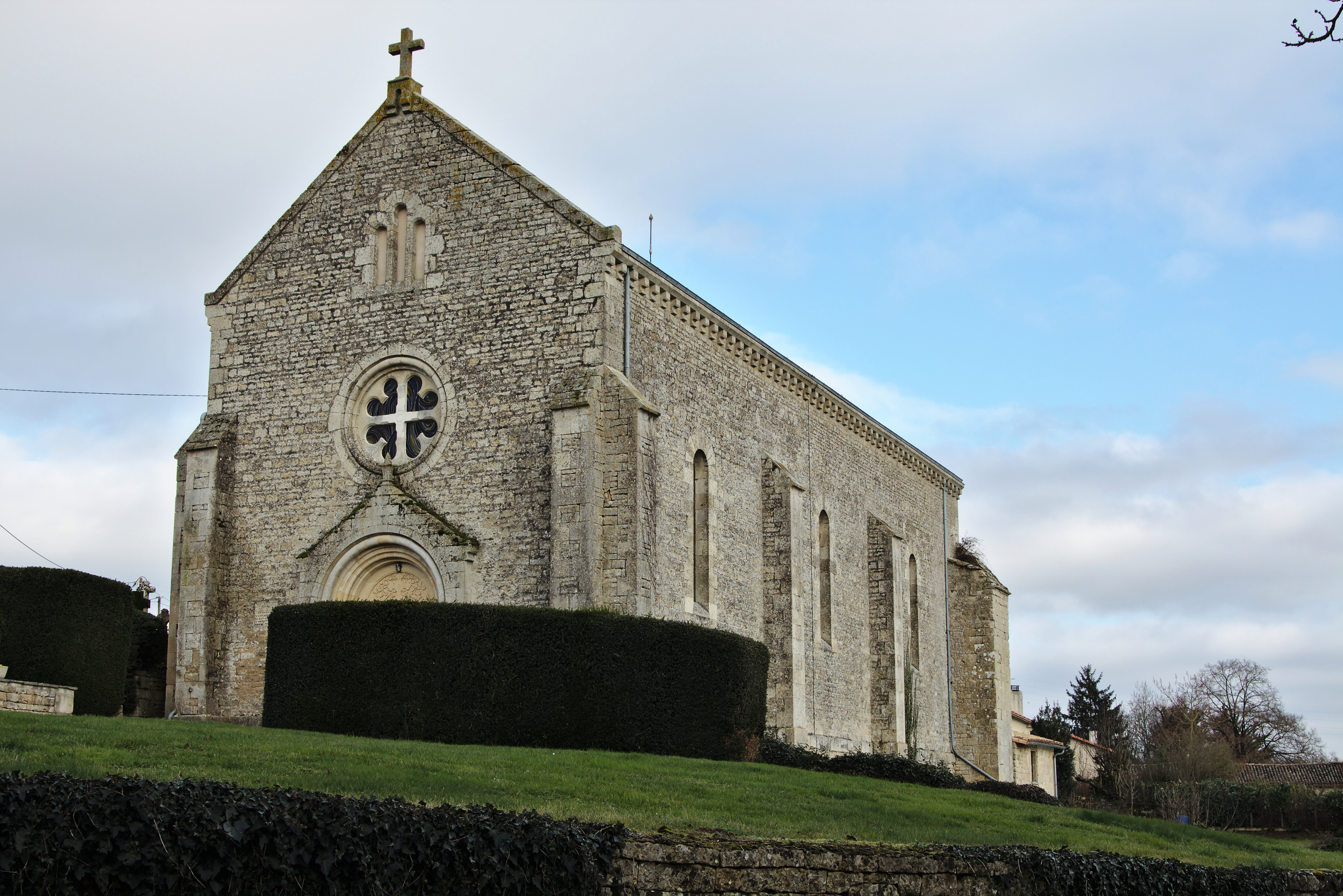
- The priory in Paizay-le-Tort
- Location of Paizay-le-Tort
- Location within France Location within Nouvelle-Aquitaine
- Coordinates: 46°10′49″N 0°09′42″W
- Country: France
- Region: Nouvelle-Aquitaine
- Department: Deux-Sèvres
- Arrondissement: Niort
- Canton: Melle
- Commune: Melle
- Area^{1}: 11.28 km^{2} (4.36 sq mi)
- Elevation: 70 m (230 ft)
- Highest elevation: 119 m (390 ft)
- Lowest elevation: 67 m (220 ft)
- Population (2022): 479
  - Density: 42.5/km^{2} (110/sq mi)
- Time zone: UTC+01:00 (CET)
  - Summer (DST): UTC+02:00 (CEST)
- Postal code: 79500
- ^{1} French Land Register data, which excludes lakes, ponds, glaciers > 1 km^{2} (0.386 sq mi or 247 acres) and river estuaries.

Paizay-le-Tort (French pronunciation: [pɛzɛ lə tɔʁ]) is a former commune in the Deux-Sèvres department in western France. On 1 January 2019, it was merged into the commune Melle.

== See also ==
- Communes of the Deux-Sèvres department
