= Saint-Léger-de-la-Martinière =

- Part of Melle
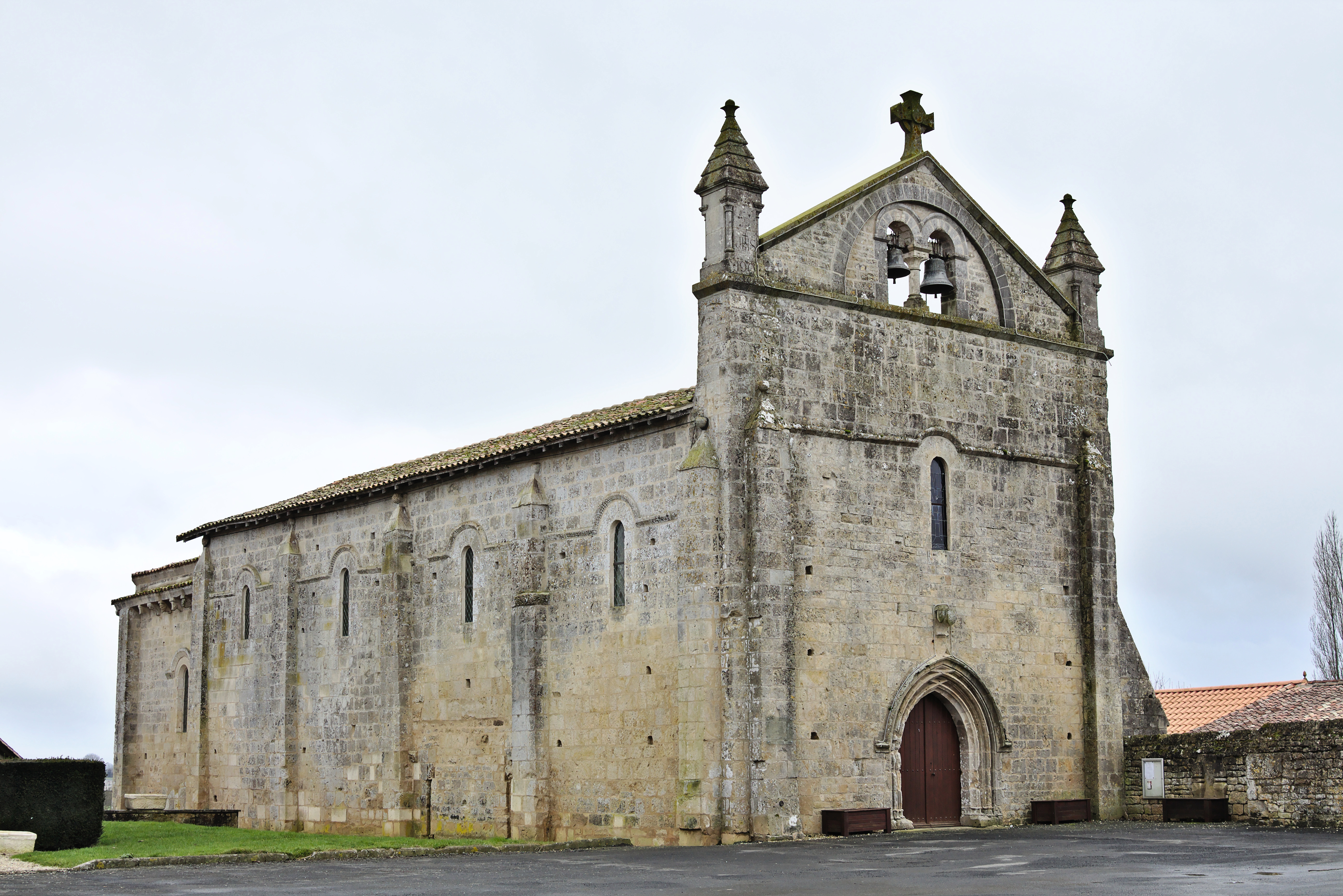
- The church in Saint-Léger-de-la-Martinière

- Coat of arms
- Location of Saint-Léger-de-la-Martinière
- Location within France Location within Nouvelle-Aquitaine
- Coordinates: 46°13′42″N 0°07′26″W
- Country: France
- Region: Nouvelle-Aquitaine
- Department: Deux-Sèvres
- Arrondissement: Niort
- Canton: Melle
- Commune: Melle
- Area^{1}: 25.64 km^{2} (9.90 sq mi)
- Elevation: 160 m (520 ft)
- Highest elevation: 183 m (600 ft)
- Lowest elevation: 107 m (351 ft)
- Population (2022): 958
  - Density: 37.4/km^{2} (96.8/sq mi)
- Time zone: UTC+01:00 (CET)
  - Summer (DST): UTC+02:00 (CEST)
- Postal code: 79500
- ^{1} French Land Register data, which excludes lakes, ponds, glaciers > 1 km^{2} (0.386 sq mi or 247 acres) and river estuaries.

Saint-Léger-de-la-Martinière (French pronunciation: [sɛ̃ leʒe də la maʁtinjɛʁ]) is a former commune in the Deux-Sèvres department in western France. On 1 January 2019, it was merged into the commune Melle.

== See also ==
- Communes of the Deux-Sèvres department
