= Frank A. Weinhold =

American Professor of Chemistry

- Born: May 18, 1941 (age 85); Scottsbluff, Nebraska
- Occupations: Chemist, academic and author

Academic background
- Education: BA., Chemistry; AM., Physical Chemistry; PhD., Physical Chemistry
- Alma mater: University of Colorado-Boulder; University of Freiburg; Harvard University
- Thesis: Reduced Density Matrices of Atoms and Molecules (1967)

Frank A. Weinhold is an American chemist, academic and author. He is an emeritus professor of chemistry at the University of Wisconsin–Madison.

Weinhold is best known for developing natural bond orbital methods and associated applications in physical and computational quantum chemistry. He has authored and co-authored over 200 software packages and technical publications along with several influential books including Valency and Bonding: A Natural Bond Orbital Donor-Acceptor Perspective, Classical and Geometrical Theory of Chemical and Phase Thermodynamics and Discovering Chemistry with Natural Bond Orbitals. His accolades include Alfred P. Sloan Award (1970), Camille Dreyfus Teacher-Scholar Award (1972), Lise Meitner-Minerva Lectureship Award for Computational Quantum Chemistry from Technion and Hebrew University (2007), and an honorary doctorate from the University of Rostock (2011).

Weinhold is a Fellow of the Royal Society of Chemistry and the American Association for the Advancement of Science. He served on the Honorary Editorial Advisory Boards of the International Journal of Quantum Chemistry and the Russian Journal of Physical Chemistry.

== Education ==
Weinhold obtained a BA in Chemistry from the University of Colorado-Boulder in 1962 and was awarded a Fulbright Scholarship to study at the University of Freiburg in 1963. He received an AM from Harvard University in 1964 and continued his studies in physical chemistry under Edgar Bright Wilson, earning a PhD in 1967. Subsequently, he conducted postdoctoral research at the University of Oxford with Charles Coulson in 1968 and at the University of California-Berkeley in 1969.

== Career ==
Weinhold began his academic career as an assistant professor at Stanford University in 1969. He then moved to the Theoretical Chemistry Institute (TCI) and Chemistry Department of the University of Wisconsin–Madison in 1976, becoming associate professor in 1977, full professor in 1979, and TCI director from 1983 to 1991. He has been an emeritus professor of chemistry at the University of Wisconsin–Madison since 2007.

== Research ==
Weinhold's contributions to the field of chemistry include development of upper and lower bounds for quantum-mechanical properties, complex-coordinate rotation theory of autoionizing resonances, Natural Bond Orbital (NBO) and Natural Resonance Theory (NRT) analysis methods, the metric geometry of equilibrium thermodynamics, and the Quantum Cluster Equilibrium (QCE) theory of fluids.

== Works ==
Weinhold's works largely focus on the quantum mechanics of chemical bonding. With Clark R. Landis, he co-authored Discovering Chemistry with Natural Bond Orbitals, which explored the conceptual basis of chemical bonding using the algorithms and keyword options of the NBO program. They also co-wrote the textbook Valency and Bonding: A Natural Bond Orbital Donor-Acceptor Perspective, which provided a modern overview of chemical bonding theory across the periodic table.

In 2009, Weinhold published the textbook, Classical and Geometrical Theory of Chemical and Phase Thermodynamics, which expounds the reformulation of Gibbsian thermodynamics as a metric geometry. This work finds notable application in the physics of black-hole thermodynamics.

=== Natural bond orbital method and extensions ===
Weinhold's research group pioneered the natural bond orbital analysis methods and their applications to molecular and supramolecular phenomena in successive versions of the NBO program. These methods include Natural Population Analysis (NPA) and Natural Bond Orbital (NBO) algorithms for extracting atomic charge and charge-transfer descriptors of intra- and interatomic interactions from modern computational models.

With Alan E. Reed, Weinhold also developed the algorithm for natural localized molecular orbitals (NLMOs), which provide an exact local representation of SCF and CI wave functions that automatically preserves σ–π separation and other localized bonding conceptions with modest computational overhead.

With Eric D. Glendening, Weinhold also developed the algorithm for Natural Resonance Theory (NRT) and the associated natural bond orders and resonance weightings. These provide computational descriptors that agree closely with the empirical resonance conceptions of Linus Pauling.

=== NBO deletions for cause-effect analysis of chemical properties ===
The NBO program, in tandem with the host electronic structure system, allows the user to delete (remove from the total energy evaluation) any chosen donor-acceptor interaction between filled (donor) and unfilled (acceptor) NBOs and re-calculate the energy as though this interaction were absent in nature. In cases where the property depends uniquely on whether the specific NBO interaction is included or not, one has direct cause/effect evidence that the deleted donor-acceptor (Lewis base-Lewis acid) interaction is the responsible physical origin for the property of interest. Such NBO-deletion techniques were used to identify the electronic origin of two mysterious structural properties: the internal rotation barriers of ethane-like molecules and the hydrogen bonds of water and many biomaterials.

With Terry K. Brunck, Weinhold showed that the characteristic 3 kcal/mol barrier to methyl torsions in ethane-like molecules is essentially removed by deletion of the vicinal σ_{CH}-σ*_{C'H'} donor-acceptor interactions between adjoining CH/C'H' NBOs, which intrinsically favor the anti-twisted ground-state geometry. Such vicinal σ_{CH}-σ*_{C'H'} interactions are now recognized as a weak form of resonance-type delocalization (hyperconjugation) that is ubiquitous in saturated molecules.

With Alan E. Reed and Larry K. Curtiss, Weinhold showed that the characteristic 5 kcal/mol H-bonding interaction between water molecules is similarly annihilated by deletion of the intermolecular n_{O'}-σ*_{OH} donor-acceptor interaction between a lone-pair (n_{O'}) of one monomer and the proximal valence antibond (σ*_{OH}) of the other, which intrinsically favors the characteristic linear O'···HO alignment of the ground-state dimer. Analogous intermolecular halogen bonds (and other X-bonding varieties) are now widely recognized as leading contributors to the clustering forces that lead to phase condensation of all materials at sufficiently low temperature.

=== Quantum Cluster Equilibrium (QCE) theory ===
Weinhold also developed the Quantum Cluster Equilibrium (QCE) method for computing (T,P)-dependent fluid-phase properties of water and other pure substances. QCE predictions are based on a model partition function composed from an equilibrium mixture of molecular clusters {Mn}, each optimized at a consistent quantum chemical level. QCE applications and experimental comparisons were performed (with co-workers Ralf Ludwig, Thomas C. Farrar, and Mark Wendt) for a variety of pure liquids, including M = water, ammonia, N-methylacetamide, formic acid and ethanol, and the theory was further extended to 2-component solutions in the Peacemaker program of Barbara Kirchner and coworkers. A noteworthy achievement of QCE theory was successful ab initio modelling of the pH of liquid water.

== Awards and honors ==
- 1970 – Alfred P. Sloan Award, Alfred P. Sloan Foundation
- 1972 – Camille Dreyfus Teacher-Scholar Award, The Camille and Henry Dreyfus Foundation
- 2007 – Lise Meitner-Minerva Lectureship Award, Technion and Hebrew University
- 2011 – Honorary Doctorate, University of Rostock

== Bibliography ==
=== Books ===
- Valency and Bonding: A Natural Bond Orbital Donor-Acceptor Perspective (2005) ISBN 978-0521831284
- Classical and Geometrical Theory of Chemical and Phase Thermodynamics (2009) ISBN 978-0470402368
- Discovering Chemistry with Natural Bond Orbitals (2012) ISBN 978-1118119969

=== Selected articles ===
- Weinhold, F. (1976). Thermodynamics and geometry. Physics Today, 29(3), 23-29.
- Foster, A. J., & Weinhold, F. (1980). Natural hybrid orbitals. Journal of the American Chemical Society, 102(24), 7211-7218.
- Reed, A. E., & Weinhold, F. (1985). Natural localized molecular orbitals. The Journal of Chemical Physics, 83(4), 1736-1740.
- Reed, A. E., Weinstock, R. B., & Weinhold, F. (1985). Natural population analysis. The Journal of Chemical Physics, 83(2), 735-746.
- Reed, A. E., Curtiss, L. A., & Weinhold, F. (1988). Intermolecular interactions from a natural bond orbital, donor-acceptor viewpoint. Chemical Reviews, 88(6), 899-926.
- Glendening, E. D., Landis, C. R., & Weinhold, F. (2019). Resonance theory reboot. Journal of the American Chemical Society, 141(10), 4156-4166.
- Weinhold, F. (2023). "Noncovalent interaction": A chemical misnomer that inhibits proper understanding of hydrogen bonding, rotation barriers, and other topics. Molecules, 28(9), 3776.
