= Alan Lidiard =

British condensed matter physicist (1928–2020)

- Born: Alan Bernard Lidiard; 9 May 1928; Waltham St Lawrence, England, UK
- Died: 21 November 2020 (aged 92)
- Education: King's College London
- Scientific career
- Institutions: University of Reading; Atomic Energy Research Establishment; University of Oxford
- Thesis: The theory of collective electron ferromagnetism
- Doctoral advisor: Charles Coulson
- Other academic advisors: Friedrich Seitz; Charles Kittel
- Doctoral students: Richard Catlow

Alan Bernard Lidiard (9 May 1928 – 21 November 2020), or A. B. Lidiard, was a British condensed matter physicist known for his research into defects in materials.

== Education and career ==
Lidiard studied theoretical physics under Charles Coulson at King's College London, obtaining an MSc in 1950 and a PhD in 1952. He spent two years as a Fulbright scholar in the USA, first as a research assistant for Friedrich Seitz at the University of Illinois Urbana-Champaign and then under Charles Kittel at University of California, Berkeley. He took up a research fellowship in the Theoretical Division at Atomic Energy Research Establishment in Harwell. Between 1957 and 1961, he was a Lecturer in Theoretical Physics at University of Reading. He returned to Harwell and set up the radiation damage theory group in the Theoretical Physics Division (TPD). Lidiard became the head of the TPD in 1966 until his retirement. Afterwards, he moved to the Department of Physics at University of Reading and the Department of Theoretical Chemistry at Oxford University.

== Honors and awards ==
Lidiard was awarded the Guthrie Medal in 1988. He was a Fellow of the Institute of Physics and a Fellow of the Royal Society of Chemistry.

== Personal life ==
Lidiard married three times. He has two daughters from his second marriage.

== Bibliography ==
- Madelung, O.; Lidiard, A. B.; Stevels, J. M.; Darmois, E. (1957). Electrical Conductivity II / Elektrische Leitungsphänomene II. Berlin, Heidelberg. ISBN 978-3-642-45859-0. OCLC 913622108.
- Allnatt, A. R.; Lidiard, A. B. (1993). Atomic transport in solids. Cambridge, UK: Cambridge University Press. ISBN 0-511-56390-6. OCLC 852653597.

== See also ==
- Marshall Stoneham
- Richard Catlow
