= Roy McWeeny =

British chemist (1924–2021)

Roy McWeeny (19 May 1924 – 29 April 2021) was a British academic physicist and chemist.

McWeeny was born in Bradford, Yorkshire in May 1924. His first degree was in physics from the University of Leeds. He then obtained a D.Phil. in mathematical physics and quantum theory under the supervision of Charles Coulson at the Mathematical Institute, University of Oxford.

From 1948 to 1957 he was lecturer in physical chemistry at King's College, University of Durham (King's College is now the University of Newcastle upon Tyne). From 1957 to 1965 he was at the University of Keele rising to Professor of Theoretical Physics and Theoretical Chemistry. From 1966 to 1982 he was Professor of Theoretical Chemistry at the University of Sheffield. In 1982 he moved to the University of Pisa, Italy where he remained an Emeritus Professor until his death.

In 1996 a celebratory festschrift volume was published in his honour containing original papers by 132 scientists from 19 countries. He was awarded the 2006 Spiers Memorial Medal by the Faraday Division of the Royal Society of Chemistry and the Medal Lecture, "Quantum chemistry: The first seventy years", was published in Faraday Discussions. He has served on the editorial board of Molecular Physics, Chemical Physics Letters and International Journal of Quantum Chemistry.

He has written many scientific papers and seven books, of which perhaps the best known are Coulson's Valence in 1979, an update of the famous book by Charles Coulson originally written in 1951, and the two editions of Methods of Molecular Quantum Mechanics, (the first edition with B. T. Sutcliffe in 1969 and the second edition alone in 1989). He wrote several chapters in the three volumes of the Handbook of Molecular Physics and Quantum Chemistry. In 1963 he wrote Symmetry: an introduction to group theory and its applications.

From 2002 he edited an open-access series of Basic Books in Science, several of which he authored himself. He was also an elected member of the International Academy of Quantum Molecular Science and the European Academy of Arts, Sciences and the Humanities.

McWeeny died in Pisa, Italy in April 2021 at the age of 96.
