= Sanibel Symposium =

The Sanibel Symposium is an international scientific conference in quantum chemistry, solid-state physics, and quantum biology. It has been organized by the Quantum Theory Project at the University of Florida in Gainesville, Florida, United States, every winter since 1960. It was founded by Per-Olov Löwdin who was involved in its organization every year from 1960 to his death in 2000. From 1960 to 1978, the symposium was held on Sanibel Island, but later symposia have been held in Palm Coast and St. Augustine. In 2005, the Symposium moved to St. Simons Island, Georgia, United States.

The Symposium is noted for its long history and for the breadth of both the participants and the presentations. The 2010 meeting covers "Forefront theory and computation in quantum chemistry, condensed matter and chemical physics, nanoscience, quantum biochemistry and biophysics". The Sanibel Symposium is described as a "highly respected regular conference" in a history of the Gordon Research Conferences.

The Sanibel Coefficients, used for example in calculated spin densities, were named after the Symposium where they were widely discussed in the 1960s.

Lectures and posters presented at the meeting are often published in the peer-reviewed journal "International Journal of Quantum Chemistry" as one or more issues of the journal. Before 1996, papers were published in special supplements of the Journal for Quantum Chemistry and Quantum Biology.
