= George Stanley Rushbrooke =

George Stanley Rushbrooke FRS FRSE
- Born: 19 January 1915; Willenhall, England
- Died: 14 December 1995 (aged 80); Newcastle upon Tyne, England
- Education: St John's College, Cambridge
- Known for: Coulson-Rushbooke theorem
- Spouse: Thelma Barbara Cox
- Awards: Mayhew Prize, 1936
- Scientific career
- Workplaces: University College, Dundee; University of Leeds; University of Oxford; Newcastle University

George Stanley Rushbrooke (19 January 1915 – 14 December 1995) was a 20th century British theoretical physicist.

== Biography ==
Rushbrooke was born in Willenhall, one of twin sons of George Henry Rushbrooke, baker and confectioner, and Frances Isabel (née Wright). After attending a small private school he moved, at age 10, to Wolverhampton Grammar School, from where he gained a State Scholarship and passed the entrance scholarship exam to St John's College, Cambridge. He entered the college in October 1933, where he read mathematics and gained Firsts throughout his examinations. He and Fred Hoyle were jointly awarded the Mayhew Prize in 1936, as the students showing the greatest distinction in applied mathematics.

He started on graduate research with Ralph H. Fowler, but did not get on well with him. He left before his thesis work was finished, and moved to the University of Bristol. This did not work out well either, so Rushbrooke accepted the offer of a research post at the University College, Dundee, for the year 1939-40. He then secured a DSIR senior research award, enabling him to join Wynne-Jones's group for the next three years. After some work with Charles Coulson, whom he knew well, he collaborated with Wynne-Jones himself.

In 1944 Rushbrooke moved on again, this time to the department of physics at the University of Leeds, as a research assistant. He was soon appointed research lecturer, and started a course on statistical mechanics for senior students. They were popular and he enjoyed giving them; they led to the publication of his book Introduction to Statistical Mechanics (Clarendon Press,1949).

In 1948 Oxford beckoned. He was appointed senior lecturer in theoretical physics at the university, and lecturer in mathematics at University College. He took on very capable researchers in several fields, such as Cyril Domb (two-dimensional Ising models), A J Wakefield (graph configurations on crystals) and Hubert Ian Scoins (theory of liquids).

In 1949 Rushbrooke married Thelma Barbara Cox, whom he had met there. She suffered from depression, especially so a year after they were married. By this time Rushbrooke had been appointed to a new chair of theoretical physics at King's College, Newcastle. After Thelma's illness, and a period in hospital himself, he moved to his new job in 1951, where he remained until retirement as emeritus professor in 1980. His two main areas of research were the theory of liquids and critical phenomena.

Reflecting on Rushbrooke's career, Domb stated that "the most significant contribution that Rushbrooke made in theoretical chemistry was undoubtedly what came to be known as the Coulson-Rushbooke theorem". He was elected a Fellow of the Royal Society of Edinburgh in 1954, and a Fellow of the Royal Society of London in 1982.

The Rushbrookes, who were childless, lived in Belle Vue Avenue, Gosforth. Thelma died on 5 March 1977. George Stanley died on 14 December 1995, and was survived by his twin brother John Yeomans, a mathematician, who died in 2004.

== Posts held ==
- 1938–39 Research Assistant, University of Bristol
- 1939–44 Senior DSIR award; Carnegie Teaching Fellowship, University College, Dundee
- 1945–47 Research Lecturer, department of physics, University of Leeds.
- 1947-48 Lecturer in Mathematical Chemistry, Leeds.
- 1948–51 Senior Lecturer in Theoretical Physics, Oxford and lecturer in Mathematics, University College, Oxford
- 1951–80 Professor of Theoretical Physics, Newcastle University
- 1962–63 Visiting Professor Department of Chemistry, University of Oregon
- 1962–67 Editor of Molecular Physics
- 1965–80 Head of Department of Theoretical Physics
- 1967 Visiting Professor of Physics and Chemistry, Rice University
- 1972–80 Deputy Head, School of Physics, Newcastle
- 1981 Leverhulme Emeritus Fellow
