= Per-Olov Löwdin =

Swedish physicist (1916–2000)

- Born: October 28, 1916; Uppsala, Sweden
- Died: October 6, 2000 (aged 83); Uppsala, Sweden
- Education: Uppsala University
- Known for: Löwdin perturbation theory Löwdin rules Löwdin weights Natural bond orbital Orthogonalization; Proton tunneling Quantum biology
- Awards: Niels Bohr Medal (1987); Lavoisier Medal (1975); St. Olav's Medal (1975); Björkénska priset (1973)
- Scientific career
- Fields: Quantum chemistry
- Workplaces: University of Uppsala; University of Florida
- Doctoral advisor: Ivar Waller

Per-Olov Löwdin (October 28, 1916 – October 6, 2000) was a Swedish physicist, professor at the University of Uppsala from 1960 to 1983, and in parallel at the University of Florida until 1993.

A former graduate student under Ivar Waller, Löwdin formulated in 1950 the symmetric orthogonalization scheme for atomic and molecular orbital calculations, greatly simplifying the tight-binding method. This scheme is the basis of the zero-differential overlap (ZDO) approximation used in semiempirical theories. In 1956 he introduced the canonical orthogonalization scheme, which is optimal for eliminating approximate linear dependencies of a basis set. These orthogonalization procedures are widely used today in all modern quantum chemistry calculations.

The famous 'Löwdin's pairing theorem' used in restricted open-shell Hartree–Fock (ROHF), unrestricted Hartree–Fock (UHF) and generalized valence bond (RES-GVB) theories is not his. According to himself, George G. Hall and King made the formal proposition after an informal suggestion by Löwdin.

His Löwdin partitioning technique for quantum chemistry problems is best appreciated through the series of 14 papers on perturbation theory published between 1963 and 1971.

He was also a very active teacher, starting the Summer Schools of Quantum Chemistry at Uppsala around 1958. In 1959 and 1960, Löwdin started the Quantum Theory Project at the University of Florida as a sister project to the Uppsala Quantum Chemistry Group. In 1964 he was joined by John C. Slater from MIT. The International Winter Institutes (held initially at Sanibel Island, and later at Gainesville) provided the initiation into quantum chemistry for hundreds of young Latin American scientists during the 1980s and 1990s. In 1960 he founded the Sanibel Symposium in conjunction with the Winter Institute, held every year since then.

Löwdin was elected a member of the Royal Swedish Academy of Sciences in 1969, the American Philosophical Society in 1983, and was a member of the committee for the Nobel Prize in Physics from 1972 to 1984. He was the founder of the International Journal of Quantum Chemistry and of the series Advances in Quantum Chemistry. He was a foundation member of the International Academy of Quantum Molecular Science.

== Publications ==
Publications
- Löwdin, Per-Olov (1939). "Lorentz-Transformationen och den Kinematiska Relativitetsprincipen". Elementa. 22 (10): 161–169.
- "A quantum mechanical calculation of the cohesive energy, the interionic distance, and the elastic constants of some crystals". Arkiv för Matematik, Astronomi och Fysik. 35A: 1–10. 1947.
- "A quantum mechanical calculation of the cohesive energy, the interionic distance, and the elastic constants of some ionic crystals. II. The elastic constants c12 and c44". Arkiv för Matematik, Astronomi och Fysik. 30: 1–18. 1948.
- Löwdin, Per-Olov (1950). "On the non-orthogonality problem connected with the use of atomic wave functions in the theory of molecules and crystals". The Journal of Chemical Physics. 18 (3): 365. Bibcode:1950JChPh..18..365L. doi:10.1063/1.1747632.
- "On the calculation of certain integrals occurring in the theory of molecules, especially three-center and four-center integrals". Arkiv för Fysik. 3: 147–154. 1951.
- "A note on the numerical calculation of asymptotic phases with a numeric study of Hulthen's variational principle". Arkiv för Fysik. 3: 155–166. 1951.
- Löwdin, Per-Olov (1951). "Calculation of Electric Dipole Moments of some Heterocyclics". The Journal of Chemical Physics. 19 (10): 1323. Bibcode:1951JChPh..19.1323L. doi:10.1063/1.1748043.
- Löwdin, Per-Olov (1951). "A note on the quantum-mechanical perturbation theory". The Journal of Chemical Physics. 19 (11): 1396. Bibcode:1951JChPh..19.1396L. doi:10.1063/1.1748067.
- Löwdin, Per-Olov (1951). "On the quantum-mechanical calculation of the cohesive energy of molecules and crystals. Part I. A general energy formula for the ground state". The Journal of Chemical Physics. 19 (12): 1570. Bibcode:1951JChPh..19.1570L. doi:10.1063/1.1748125.
- Löwdin, Per-Olov (1951). "On the quantum-mechanical calculation of the cohesive energy of molecules and crystals. Part II. Treatment of the alkali metals with numerical applications to sodium". The Journal of Chemical Physics. 19 (12): 1579. Bibcode:1951JChPh..19.1579L. doi:10.1063/1.1748126.
- Löwdin, Per-Olov (1953). "Studies of atomic self-consistent Fields. I. Calculation of Slater functions". Physical Review. 90 (1): 120–125. Bibcode:1953PhRv...90..120L. doi:10.1103/PhysRev.90.120.
- Löwdin, Per-Olov (1953). "Approximate formulas for many-center integrals in the theory of molecules and crystals". The Journal of Chemical Physics. 21 (2): 374. Bibcode:1953JChPh..21..374L. doi:10.1063/1.1698901.
- Löwdin, Per-Olov (1953). "On the molecular-orbital theory of conjugated organic compounds with application to the perturbed benzene ring". The Journal of Chemical Physics. 21 (3): 496–515. Bibcode:1953JChPh..21..496L. doi:10.1063/1.1698934. S2CID 53968623.
- Löwdin, Per-Olov (1954). "Studies of atomic self-consistent fields. II. Interpolation problems". Physical Review. 94 (6): 1600–1609. Bibcode:1954PhRv...94.1600L. doi:10.1103/PhysRev.94.1600.
- Löwdin, Per-Olov (1955). "Quantum theory of many-particle systems. I. Physical interpretations by means of density matrices, natural spin-orbitals, and convergence problems in the method of configurational interaction". Physical Review. 97 (6): 1474–1489. Bibcode:1955PhRv...97.1474L. doi:10.1103/PhysRev.97.1474.
- Löwdin, Per-Olov (1955). "Quantum theory of many-particle systems. II. Study of ordinary Hartree-Fock approximation". Physical Review. 97 (6): 1490–1508. Bibcode:1955PhRv...97.1490L. doi:10.1103/PhysRev.97.1490.
- Löwdin, Per-Olov (1955). "Quantum theory of many-particle systems. III. Extension of the Hartree-Fock scheme to include degenerate systems and correlation effects". Physical Review. 97 (6): 1509–1520. Bibcode:1955PhRv...97.1509L. doi:10.1103/PhysRev.97.1509.
- Löwdin, Per-Olov (1955). "The historical development of the electron correlation problem". International Journal of Quantum Chemistry. 55 (2): 77–102. doi:10.1002/qua.560550203.
- Shull, Harrison; Löwdin, Per-Olov (1955). "Natural spin orbitals for helium". The Journal of Chemical Physics. 23 (8): 1565. Bibcode:1955JChPh..23.1565S. doi:10.1063/1.1742383.
- Löwdin, Per-Olov (1956). "Quantum theory of cohesive properties of solids". Advances in Physics. 5 (17): 1. Bibcode:1956AdPhy...5....1L. doi:10.1080/00018735600101155.
- Löwdin, Per-Olov; Shull, Harrison (1956). "Natural orbitals in the quantum theory of two-electron systems". Physical Review. 101 (6): 1730–1739. Bibcode:1956PhRv..101.1730L. doi:10.1103/PhysRev.101.1730.
- Löwdin, Per-Olov; Appel, Klaus (1956). "Studies of atomic self-consistent fields. Analytics wave functions for the argon-like ions and for the first row of the transition metals". Physical Review. 103 (6): 1746–1755. Bibcode:1956PhRv..103.1746L. doi:10.1103/PhysRev.103.1746.
- Shull, Harrison; Löwdin, Per-Olov (1956). "Correlation splitting in helium-like ions". The Journal of Chemical Physics. 25 (5): 1035. Bibcode:1956JChPh..25.1035S. doi:10.1063/1.1743093.
- Löwdin, Per-Olov (1957). "Present situation in Quantum Chemistry". The Journal of Physical Chemistry. 61 (1): 55–68. doi:10.1021/j150547a012.
- Löwdin, Per-Olov (1958). "Spin Degeneracy Problem". Colloq. Intern. Centre Natl. Recherche Sci. (Paris). 82: 23.
- Shull, Harrison; Löwdin, Per-Olov (1958). "Variation theorem for excited states". Physical Review. 110 (6): 1466–1467. Bibcode:1958PhRv..110.1466S. doi:10.1103/PhysRev.110.1466.
- Löwdin, Per-Olov; Rèdei, Lajos (1959). "Combined use of the methods of superposition of configurations and correlation factor on the ground states of helium-like ions". Physical Review. 114 (3): 752–757. Bibcode:1959PhRv..114..752L. doi:10.1103/PhysRev.114.752.
- Löwdin, Per-Olov (1959). "Scaling problem, virial theorem, and connected relations in quantum mechanics". Journal of Molecular Spectroscopy. 3 (1–6): 46–66. Bibcode:1959JMoSp...3...46L. doi:10.1016/0022-2852(59)90006-2.
- Shull, Harrison; Löwdin, Per-Olov (1959). "Superposition of configurations and natural spin orbitals. Applications to the He problem". The Journal of Chemical Physics. 30 (3): 617. Bibcode:1959JChPh..30..617S. doi:10.1063/1.1730019.
- Löwdin, Per-Olov (1960). "Quantum Theory of electronic structure of molecules". Annu. Rev. Phys. Chem. 11 (1): 107–132. Bibcode:1960ARPC...11..107L. doi:10.1146/annurev.pc.11.100160.000543.
- Löwdin, Per-Olov (1960). "Expansion theorems for the total wave function and extended Hartree-Fock Schemes". Reviews of Modern Physics. 32 (2): 328–334. Bibcode:1960RvMP...32..328L. doi:10.1103/RevModPhys.32.328.
- Löwdin, Per-Olov (1961). "Note on the separability theorem for electron pairs". The Journal of Chemical Physics. 35 (1): 78. Bibcode:1961JChPh..35...78L. doi:10.1063/1.1731935.
- Löwdin, Per-Olov (1962). "Studies in perturbation theory. IV. Solution of eigenvalue problem by projection operator formalism". Journal of Mathematical Physics. 3 (5): 969. Bibcode:1962JMP.....3..969L. doi:10.1063/1.1724312.
- Löwdin, Per-Olov (1962). "Studies in perturbation theory. V. Some aspects on the exact self-consistent field theory". Journal of Mathematical Physics. 3 (6): 1171. Bibcode:1962JMP.....3.1171L. doi:10.1063/1.1703860.
- Löwdin, Per-Olov (1962). "Band theory, valence bond, and tight-binding calculations". Journal of Applied Physics. 33 (1): 251. Bibcode:1962JAP....33..251L. doi:10.1063/1.1777106.
- Löwdin, Per-Olov (1962). "Exchange, correlation, and spin effects in molecular and solid-state theory". Reviews of Modern Physics. 34 (1): 80–87. Bibcode:1962RvMP...34...80L. doi:10.1103/RevModPhys.34.80.
- Löwdin, Per-Olov (1962). "The normal constants of motion in quantum mechanics treated by projection technique". Reviews of Modern Physics. 34 (3): 520–530. Bibcode:1962RvMP...34..520L. doi:10.1103/RevModPhys.34.520.
- Calais, Jean-Louis; Löwdin, Per-Olov (1962). "A simple method of treating atomic integrals containing functions of r_{12}". Journal of Molecular Spectroscopy. 8 (1–6): 203–211. Bibcode:1962JMoSp...8..203C. doi:10.1016/0022-2852(62)90021-8.
- Löwdin, Per-Olov (1963). "Wave and reaction operators in the quantum theory of many-article systems". Reviews of Modern Physics. 35 (3): 702–707. Bibcode:1963RvMP...35..702L. doi:10.1103/RevModPhys.35.702.
- Löwdin, Per-Olov (1963). "Proton tunneling in DNA and its biological implications". Reviews of Modern Physics. 35 (3): 724–732. Bibcode:1963RvMP...35..724L. doi:10.1103/RevModPhys.35.724.
- Löwdin, Per-Olov (1963). "Studies in perturbation theor: Part I. An elementary iteration-variation procedure for solving the Schrödinger equation by partitioning technique". Journal of Molecular Spectroscopy. 10 (1–6): 12–33. Bibcode:1963JMoSp..10...12L. doi:10.1016/0022-2852(63)90151-6.
- Löwdin, Per-Olov (1964). "Angular momentum wavefunctions constructed by projector operators". Reviews of Modern Physics. 36 (4): 966–976. Bibcode:1964RvMP...36..966L. doi:10.1103/RevModPhys.36.966.
- Löwdin, Per-Olov (1964). "Studies in perturbation theory: Part VI. Contraction of secular equations". Journal of Molecular Spectroscopy. 14 (1–4): 112–118. Bibcode:1964JMoSp..14..112L. doi:10.1016/0022-2852(64)90106-7.
- Löwdin, Per-Olov (1964). "Studies in perturbation theory: Part VII. Localized perturbation". Journal of Molecular Spectroscopy. 14 (1–4): 199–130. Bibcode:1964JMoSp..14..119L. doi:10.1016/0022-2852(64)90107-9.
- Löwdin, Per-Olov (1964). "Studies in perturbation theory: Part VIII. Separation of Dirac equation and study of the spin-orbit coupling and Fermi contact terms". Journal of Molecular Spectroscopy. 14 (1–4): 131–144. Bibcode:1964JMoSp..14..131L. doi:10.1016/0022-2852(64)90108-0.
- Löwdin, Per-Olov (1965). "Studies in perturbation theory. IX. connection between various approaches in the recent development – evaluation of upper bounds to energy eigenvalues in Schrödinger's perturbation theory". Journal of Mathematical Physics. 6 (8): 1341–1353. Bibcode:1965JMP.....6.1341L. doi:10.1063/1.1704781.
- Löwdin, Per-Olov (1965). "Studies in perturbation theory. X. Lower bounds to energy eigenvalues in perturbation-theory ground state". Physical Review. 139 (2A): A357–A372. Bibcode:1965PhRv..139..357L. doi:10.1103/PhysRev.139.A357.
- Löwdin, Per-Olov (1965). "Studies in perturbation theory. XI. Lower bounds to energy eigenvalues, ground state, and excited states". The Journal of Chemical Physics. 43 (10): S175–S185. Bibcode:1965JChPh..43S.175L. doi:10.1063/1.1701483. hdl:2060/19660007693.
- Löwdin, Per-Olov (1966). "Quantum Genetics and the Aperiodic Solid". Quantum genetics and the aperiodic solid: Some aspects on the biological problems of heredity, mutations, aging and tumors in view of the quantum theory of the DNA molecule. Advances in Quantum Chemistry. Vol. 2. pp. 213–360. Bibcode:1966AdQC....2..213L. doi:10.1016/S0065-3276(08)60076-3. ISBN 978-0-12-034802-2.
- Löwdin, Per-Olov (1967). "Group algebra, convolution algebra, and applications to quantum mechanics". Reviews of Modern Physics. 39 (2): 259–187. Bibcode:1967RvMP...39..259L. doi:10.1103/RevModPhys.39.259.
- Löwdin, Per-Olov (1967). "Quantum theory of time-dependent phenomena treated by the evolution operator technique". Advances in Quantum Chemistry Volume 3. Vol. 3. pp. 323–381. Bibcode:1967AdQC....3..323L. doi:10.1016/S0065-3276(08)60092-1. hdl:2060/19660007795. ISBN 978-0-12-034803-9.
- Löwdin, Per-Olov (1968). "Studies in perturbation theory XIII. Treatment of constants of motion in resolvent method, partitioning technique, and perturbation theory". International Journal of Quantum Chemistry. 2 (6): 867–931. Bibcode:1968IJQC....2..867L. doi:10.1002/qua.560020612.
- Löwdin, Per-Olov (1968). "Some comments on the treatment of symmetry properties in perturbation theory". International Journal of Quantum Chemistry. 2 (S2): 137–150. Bibcode:1968IJQC....2..137L. doi:10.1002/qua.560020715.
- MacIntyre, Walter M.; Löwdin, Per-Olov (1968). "Electronic energy of the DNA replication plane". International Journal of Quantum Chemistry. 2 (S2): 207–217. Bibcode:1968IJQC....2..207M. doi:10.1002/qua.560020720.
- Berrondo, Manuel; Löwdin, Per-Olov (1969). "The projection operator for a space spanned by a linearly dependent set". International Journal of Quantum Chemistry. 3 (6): 767–780. Bibcode:1969IJQC....3..767B. doi:10.1002/qua.560030604.
- Löwdin, Per-Olov (1969). "Some comments on the periodic system of elements". International Journal of Quantum Chemistry. 3 (S3A): 331–334. Bibcode:1969IJQC....3..331L. doi:10.1002/qua.560030737.
- Löwdin, Per-Olov (1969). "some aspects of the hydrogen bond in molecular biology". Annals of the New York Academy of Sciences. 158 (1): 86–95. Bibcode:1969NYASA.158...86L. doi:10.1111/j.1749-6632.1969.tb56215.x. PMID 5256969. S2CID 9646946.
- Löwdin, Per-Olov (1970). "On the nonorthogonality problem". Advances in Quantum Chemistry Volume 5. Vol. 5. pp. 185–199. Bibcode:1970AdQC....5..185L. doi:10.1016/S0065-3276(08)60339-1. ISBN 978-0-12-034805-3.
- Gruninger, John; Öhrn, Yngve; Löwdin, Per-Olov (1970). "Comments on the analysis of atomic correlation energies". The Journal of Chemical Physics. 52 (11): 5551. Bibcode:1970JChPh..52.5551G. doi:10.1063/1.1672824.
- Löwdin, Per-Olov; Goscinski, Osvaldo (1970). "The exchange phenomenon, the symmetric group, and the spin degeneracy problem". International Journal of Quantum Chemistry. 4 (S38): 533–591. doi:10.1002/qua.560040719.
- Löwdin, Per-Olov (1971). "Some properties of inner projections". International Journal of Quantum Chemistry. 5 (S4): 231–237. doi:10.1002/qua.560050725.
- Laskowski, Bernard; Löwdin, Per-Olov (1972). "Treatment of constants of motion in the variation principle. Symmetry properties of variational wavefunctions". Chemical Physics Letters. 16 (1): 1–4. Bibcode:1972CPL....16....1L. doi:10.1016/0009-2614(72)80441-X.
- Löwdin, Per-Olov; Mukherjee, P. K. (1972). "Some comments on the time-dependent variation principle". Chemical Physics Letters. 14 (1): 1–7. Bibcode:1972CPL....14....1L. doi:10.1016/0009-2614(72)87127-6.
- Ahlenius, T.; Calais, J.-L.; Löwdin, Per-Olov (1973). "Some comments on the construction of an orthonornal set of LCAO basis functions for crystals". Journal of Physics C: Solid State Physics. 6 (11): 1896. Bibcode:1973JPhC....6.1896A. doi:10.1088/0022-3719/6/11/016.
- Laskowski, B.; van Leuven, P.; Löwdin, Per-Olov; Lowdin, P -O (1973). "Electron gas test for the alternant molecular orbital method". Journal of Physics C: Solid State Physics. 6 (18): 2777. Bibcode:1973JPhC....6.2777L. doi:10.1088/0022-3719/6/18/007.
- Löwdin, Per-Olov (1980). Molecular structure calculations. Advances in Quantum Chemistry. Vol. 12. pp. 263–316. Bibcode:1980AdQC...12..263L. doi:10.1016/S0065-3276(08)60318-4. ISBN 978-0-12-034812-1.
- Löwdin, Per-Olov (1980). "Introductory remarks to Nobel Symposium on many-body theory of atomic systems". Physica Scripta. 21 (3–4): 229. Bibcode:1980PhyS...21..229L. doi:10.1088/0031-8949/21/3-4/002. S2CID 250808961.
- Taurian, Oscar E.; Löwdin, Per-Olov (1981). "Some remarks on the projector associated with the intersection of two linear manifolds". Acta Physica Academiae Scientiarum Hungaricae. 51 (1–2): 5–12. doi:10.1007/BF03155558. S2CID 120887514.
- Löwdin, Per-Olov (1982). "Partitioning technique, perturbation theory, and rational approximations". International Journal of Quantum Chemistry. 21 (1): 69–92. doi:10.1002/qua.560210105.
- Löwdin, Per-Olov (1982). "On operators, superoperators, hamiltonians, and liouvillians". International Journal of Quantum Chemistry. 22 (S16): 485–560. doi:10.1002/qua.560220847.
- Froelich, Piotr; Löwdin, Per-Olov (1983). "On the Hartree-Fock scheme for a pair of adjoint operators". Journal of Mathematical Physics. 24 (1): 88. Bibcode:1983JMP....24...88F. doi:10.1063/1.525605.
- Löwdin, Per-Olov (1983). "On the stability problem of a pair of adjoint operators". Journal of Mathematical Physics. 25 (1): 70–87. Bibcode:1983JMP....24...70L. doi:10.1063/1.525604.
- Löwdin, Per-Olov (1983). "On the Sanibel coefficients in the expansion of spin-projected Slater determinants". International Journal of Quantum Chemistry. 24 (1): 729–745. doi:10.1002/qua.560240615.
- Löwdin, Per-Olov (1984). "Some aspects on the relation between the natural sciences and the human mind: An introduction to a panel discussion on the origin of life and mind". International Journal of Quantum Chemistry. 26 (S11): 31–43. doi:10.1002/qua.560260705.
- Löwdin, Per-Olov (1985). "On the connection between the resolvent methods and partitioning technique, rational approximation, and perturbation theory". Physica Scripta. 32 (4): 261. Bibcode:1985PhyS...32..261L. doi:10.1088/0031-8949/32/4/002. S2CID 250768623.
- Löwdin, Per-Olov (1985). "Some aspects on the Hamiltonian and Liouvillian formalism, the special propagator methods, and the equation of motion approach". Advances in Quantum Chemistry Volume 17. Vol. 17. pp. 285–334. Bibcode:1985AdQC...17..285L. doi:10.1016/S0065-3276(08)60305-6. ISBN 978-0-12-034817-6.
- Löwdin, Per-Olov (1986). "Some comments on the method of complex scaling to find physical resonance states". International Journal of Quantum Chemistry. 30 (S20): 743–748. doi:10.1002/qua.560300763.
- Shik Kong, Young Shik; Jhon, Mu Shik; Löwdin, Per-Olov (1987). "Studies on proton transfers in water clusters and DNA base pairs". International Journal of Quantum Chemistry. 32 (S14): 189–209. doi:10.1002/qua.560320820.
- Löwdin, Per-Olov (1992). On linear algebra, the least squares method and the search for linear relations by regression analysis in quantum chemistry and other sciences. Advances in Quantum Chemistry. Vol. 23. p. 83. Bibcode:1992AdQC...23...83L. doi:10.1016/S0065-3276(08)60029-5. ISBN 978-0-12-034823-7.
- Löwdin, Per-Olov; Mayer, István (1992). Some studies of the general Hartree-Fock method. Advances in Quantum Chemistry. Vol. 24. pp. 79–114. Bibcode:1992AdQC...24...79L. doi:10.1016/S0065-3276(08)60101-X. ISBN 978-0-12-034824-4.
- Löwdin, Per-Olov (1992). "Some aspects of objectivity and reality in modern science". Foundations of Physics. 22 (1): 41–105. Bibcode:1992FoPh...22...41L. doi:10.1007/BF01883380. S2CID 121458194.
- Mayer, István; Löwdin, Per-Olov (1993). "Some comments of the general Hartree-Fock method". Chemical Physics Letters. 202 (1–2): 1–6. Bibcode:1993CPL...202....1M. doi:10.1016/0009-2614(93)85341-K.
- Löwdin, Per-Olov (1993). "Some remarks on the resemblance theorems associated with various orthonormalization procedures". International Journal of Quantum Chemistry. 48 (4): 225–232. doi:10.1002/qua.560480403.
- Bartlett, Rodney J.; Deumens, Erik; Löwdin, Per-Olov; Micha, David A.; Monkhorst, Hendrik J.; Sabin, John R.; Trickey, Samuel B.; Zerner, Michael C. (1994). "On the occasion of Yngve Öhrn's 60th birthday". International Journal of Quantum Chemistry. 52 (S28): 3–5. doi:10.1002/qua.560520803.
- Löwdin, Per-Olov (1996). "In memory of Jean-Louis Calais". International Journal of Quantum Chemistry. 57 (1): 1–2. doi:10.1002/qua.560570102.
- Löwdin, Per-Olov (1997). "Some aspects on the development of the natural sciences and their importance for modern society and for our global environment". International Journal of Quantum Chemistry. 64 (2): 158–169. doi:10.1002/(SICI)1097-461X(1997)64:2<157::AID-QUA2>3.0.CO;2-V.
- Löwdin, Per-Olov (1998). Some comments on the foundations of physics. World Scientific. Bibcode:1998scfp.book.....L. doi:10.1142/3331. ISBN 978-981-02-2913-9.
- Löwdin, Per-Olov (1998). "Some aspects on the Bloch-Lindgren equation and a comparison with the partitioning technique". Advances in Quantum Chemistry Volume 30. Vol. 30. pp. 415–432. Bibcode:1998AdQC...30..415L. doi:10.1016/S0065-3276(08)60520-1. ISBN 978-0-12-034830-5.
- Löwdin, Per-Olov (2001). "Quantum theory of cohesive properties of solids". Advances in Physics. 50 (6): 597–756. Bibcode:2001AdPhy..50..597L. doi:10.1080/00018730110102196. S2CID 123635495.
