= Ivar Waller =

Swedish theoretical physicist (1898–1991)

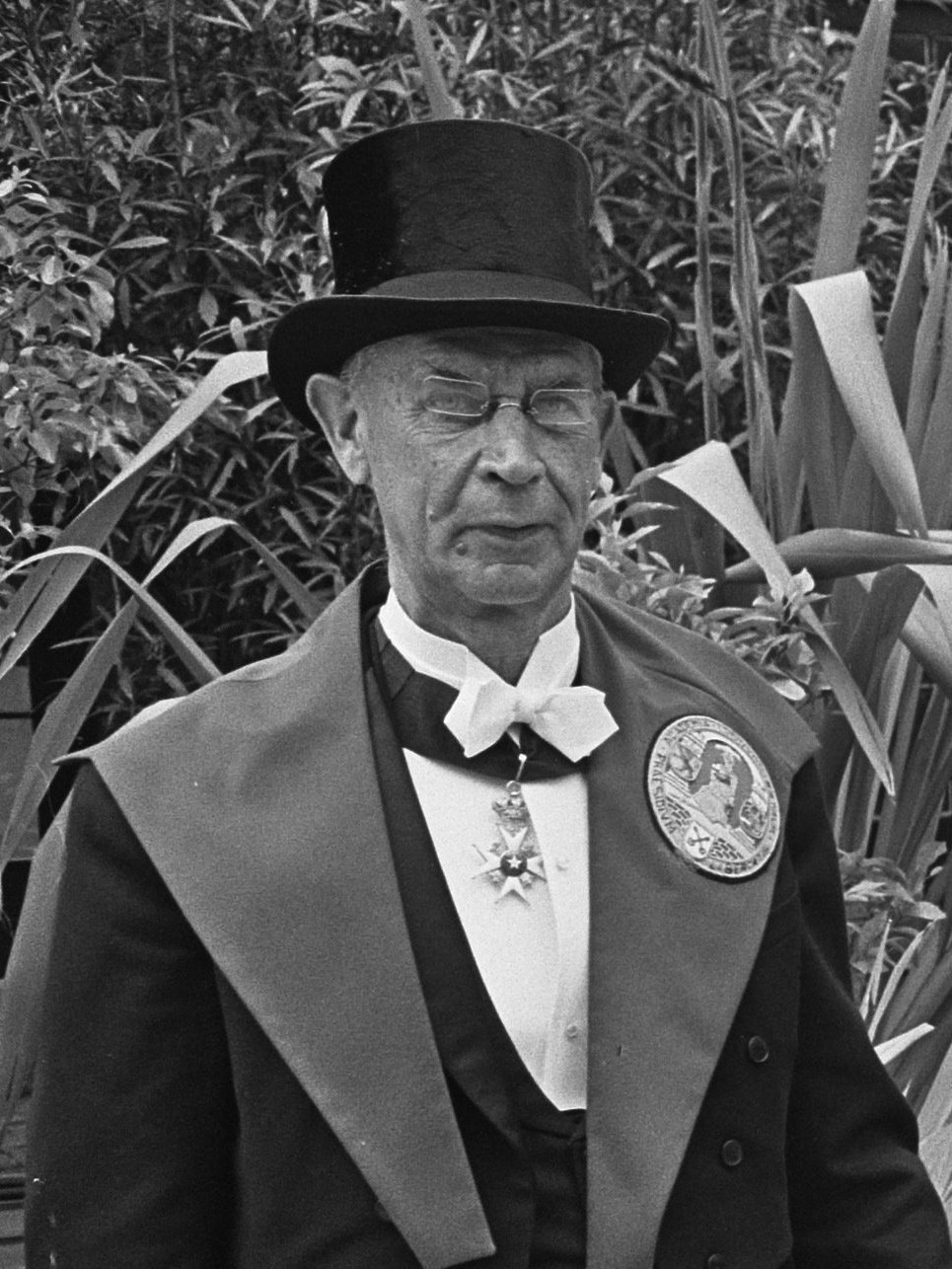
- Ivar Waller (Leiden, 1965)
- Born: 11 June 1898
- Died: 12 April 1991 (aged 92)
- Known for: Debye–Waller factor
- Scientific career
- Institutions: Uppsala University
- Doctoral students: Per-Olov Löwdin

Ivar Waller (11 June 1898 – 12 April 1991) was a Swedish professor of theoretical physics at Uppsala University. He developed the theory of X-ray scattering by lattice vibrations of a crystal, building upon the prior work of Peter Debye. The Debye–Waller factor, which he introduced in his doctoral thesis in 1925, is the definitive treatment of the effect of thermal vibrations in X-ray crystallography. He was a member of the Royal Swedish Academy of Sciences from 1945, and the Nobel Committee for Physics 1945-1972.

One of his notable doctoral students was the quantum chemist Per-Olov Löwdin.
