= Bidyendu Mohan Deb =

Indian chemist (September 27, 1942-October 19, 2026)

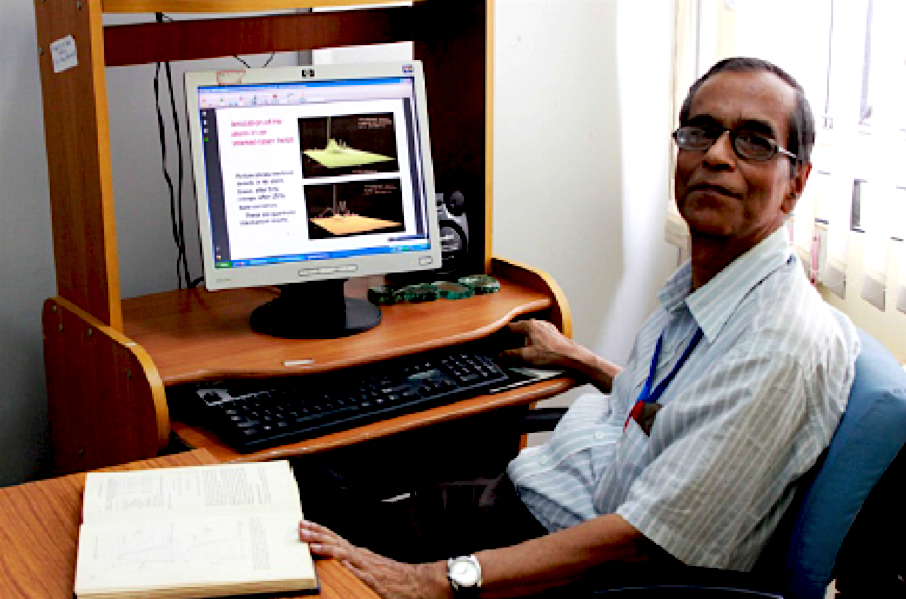
- Born: 27 September 1942 (age 84); Bengal, India
- Education: Presidency College, Kolkata; Rajabazar Science College; (University of Calcutta); Mathematical Institute, University of Oxford
- Known for: Force Concept in Chemistry; Quantum fluid dynamical density functional theory (QFDFT); Deb-Chattaraj generalized nonlinear Schrödinger equation (DC equation); Development of a molecular geometry model (HOMO postulate); Time-dependent quantum mechanics
- Awards: 1981 Shanti Swarup Bhatnagar Prize; 1988 UGC Sir C. V. Raman Award; 1995 IACS S. R. Palit Memorial Award; 1996 FICCI Award; 2000 CRSI Silver Medal; 2015 CRSI Gold Medal
- Scientific career
- Fields: Theoretical chemistry; Chemical physics
- Workplaces: Indian Association for the Cultivation of Science; Indian Institute of Technology, Mumbai; Birla Institute of Technology and Science; Panjab University; Jawaharlal Nehru Centre for Advanced Scientific Research; Indian Institute of Science Education and Research, Kolkata; Visva-Bharati University
- Doctoral advisor: Charles Coulson

Bidyendu Mohan Deb (born 27 September 1942) is an Indian theoretical chemist, chemical physicist and a professor at the Indian Institute of Science Education and Research, Kolkata (IISER). He is known for his studies in theoretical chemistry and chemical physics. He is part of the International Union of Pure and Applied Chemistry, The World Academy of Sciences, Indian National Science Academy and the Indian Academy of Sciences.

In 1981, the Council of Scientific and Industrial Research awarded him the Shanti Swarup Bhatnagar Prize for Science and Technology for his contributions to chemical sciences.

== Early life and education ==
Bidyendu Deb was born on 27 September 1942 in Bengal province in British India. He obtained his Honours BSc in Chemistry from the Presidency College in Kolkata (now Presidency University) and completed his master's degree in physical chemistry at the Rajabazar Science College (now the University College of Science, Technology and Agriculture).

Subsequently, he joined S. R. Palit at the Indian Association for the Cultivation of Science (IACS) for a year, before moving to the University of Oxford's Mathematical Institute. There, he completed a Diploma in Advanced Mathematics on a Commonwealth scholarship. Continuing at Oxford, he completed his doctoral research under the supervision of Charles Coulson, obtaining a DPhil in mathematics.

== Professional career ==
Deb started his early professional career in 1969 as a CSIR pool officer. In 1970, he moved to the Indian Institute of Technology, Mumbai (IIT Mumbai) as a faculty member. In 1971, he was appointed as an assistant professor at the Birla Institute of Technology and Science in Pilani (BITS Pilani). He spent a year there before returning to IIT Mumbai, where he spent the next 12 years, serving as an assistant professor (1973–78) and as a professor (1978–84).

In 1984, Deb moved to Panjab University as a professor of theoretical chemistry and taught there until his retirement in 2004. After his retirement, he took up the position of ISRO Vikram Sarabhai Research Professor at the S. N. Bose National Centre for Basic Sciences in Kolkata. Not long after in 2007, he took up the position of Adjunct/Visiting Professorship at the Indian Institute of Science Education and Research in Kolkata.

Currently, he serves as an INSA Senior Scientist and Honorary Scholar-in-Residence at Visva-Bharati University.

== Legacy ==
Deb's main contributions are in the field of theoretical chemistry and the molecular geometry model he developed to demonstrate the influence of electronuclear attractive force and one of the highest occupied molecular orbitals in the determination of molecular shapes. His work on the applicability of the concept of internal stresses of molecules and solids revealed their relation to the density-functional theory and quantum fluid dynamics. He developed methodologies for predicting new molecules using quantum chemistry and for combining cellular automata with Thomas-Fermi-Dirac theory.

One of the early pioneers of the electron density theory in chemistry, Deb's main focus was on developing the foundations for a possible density-based alternative quantum mechanics bypassing the Schrödinger equation and the many-electron wave-function. He emphasized the general interpretative aspects of the electron density in chemistry. For both these ends, he concentrated on developing a single time-dependent equation (the Deb-Chattaraj or DC equation) for the direct calculation of electron density, which is different from the usual density functional theory.

His research have been published in peer-reviewed academic journals (Note: Please see Selected bibliography section) and he has authored two books, The Force Concept in Chemistry and The Single-Particle Density in Physics and Chemistry. He has also written about holistic education as well as on Satyajit Ray, one of the pioneers of modern Indian cinema. He was also involved with curriculum designing programs and seminars and has been associated with science journals as a member of their editorial boards.

In 2015, he published the book "The peacock in splendour: Science, literature and arts in ancient and medieval India" which focuses on Indology.

== Awards and honors ==
The Council of Scientific and Industrial Research awarded Deb the Shanti Swarup Bhatnagar Prize, one of the highest Indian science awards, in 1981.

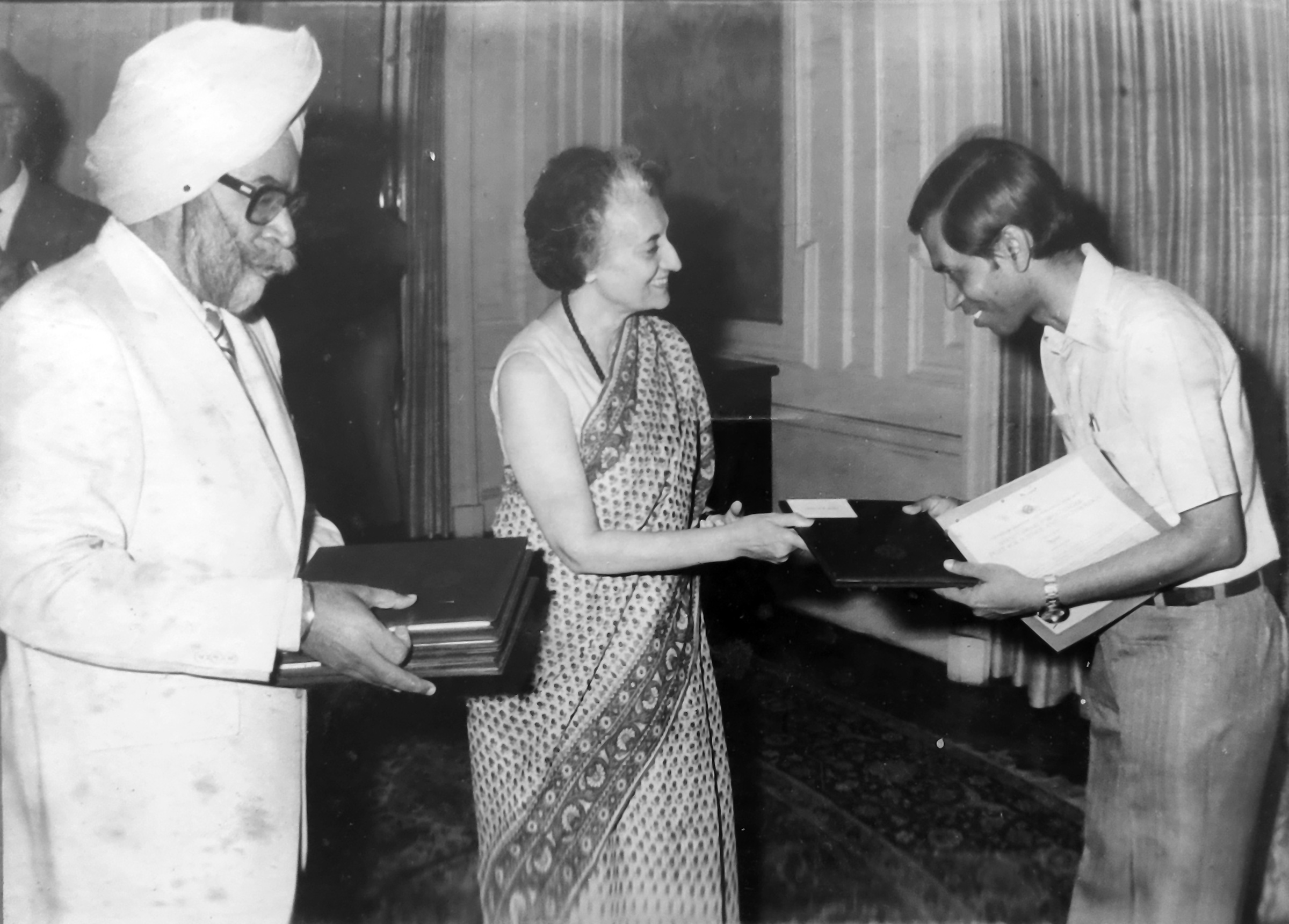
B M Deb SS Bhatnagar Prize 1981

A guest scholar of the Kyoto University in 1989 and an honorary professor of the Jawaharlal Nehru Centre for Advanced Scientific Research from 1992 to 2004, he received the Sir C. V. Raman Award in Physical Sciences of the University Grants Commission of India in 1988, Biennial Professor S. R. Palit Memorial Award of the Indian Association for the Cultivation of Science in 1995 and the FICCI Award in Physical Sciences in 1996. He is also a recipient of the Silver Medal (2000) and the Gold Medal (2015) of the Chemical Research Society of India. The list of award orations he has delivered include Linus Pauling Memorial Lecture of Mahatma Gandhi University (1996), Professor Sadhan Basu Memorial Lecture of the Indian National Science Academy (1999), Mitra Memorial Lecture of Delhi University (2000), A. V. Rama Rao Foundation Lecture of Jawaharlal Nehru Centre for Advanced Scientific Research (2003), Distinguished Lectures and Institute/University colloquia at a number of national institutions including Panjab University Colloquium of 2016. The Indian Academy of Sciences elected him as a fellow in 1984 and he became a fellow of the Indian National Science Academy in 1987. He is also an elected part of The World Academy of Sciences and the International Union of Pure and Applied Chemistry. In 2019, Deb was conferred a Life-time Achievement Award from the Indian Chemical Society (estd. 1924) and received this at the Annual Convention of Chemists, Raipur, India.

== Citations ==
- Swapan Kumar Ghosh; Pratim Kumar Chattaraj (19 April 2016). Concepts and Methods in Modern Theoretical Chemistry: Electronic Structure and Reactivity. CRC Press. pp. 117–. ISBN 978-1-4665-0531-5.
- Jens Peder Dahl; John Avery (11 November 2013). Local Density Approximations in Quantum Chemistry and Solid State Physics. Springer Science & Business Media. pp. 120–. ISBN 978-1-4899-2142-0.
- Chandana Sinha; Shib Shankar Bhattacharyya (2007). Current Topics in Atomic, Molecular and Optical Physics: Invited Lectures Delivered at the Conference on Atomic Molecular and Optical Physics (TC 2005), 13th-15th December, 2005, Indian Association for the Cultivation of Science, Kolkata, India. World Scientific. pp. 33–. ISBN 978-981-277-251-0.
- Viraht Sahni (16 October 2009). Quantal Density Functional Theory II: Approximation Methods and Applications. Springer Science & Business Media. pp. 417–. ISBN 978-3-540-92229-2.
- Xavier Oriols Pladevall; Jordi Mompart (4 June 2012). Applied Bohmian Mechanics: From Nanoscale Systems to Cosmology. CRC Press. pp. 298–. ISBN 978-981-4316-39-2.
- Muthusamy Lakshmanan (6 December 2012). Solitons: Introduction and Applications. Springer Science & Business Media. pp. 365–. ISBN 978-3-642-73193-8.

== Selected bibliography ==
=== Books ===
- B. M. Deb (2015). The Peacock in Splendour. Visva Bharati Publications. ISBN 978-81-7522-452-0.
- B. M. Deb (1981). The Force concept in chemistry. Van Nostrand Reinhold. ISBN 978-0-442-26106-1.
- N. H. March; B. M. Deb (1987). The single-particle density in physics and chemistry. Academic Press. ISBN 978-0-12-470518-0.

=== Articles ===
- Deb, B. M. (1973). "The force concept in chemistry". Rev. Mod. Phys. 45 (1): 22–43. Bibcode:1973RvMP...45...22D. doi:10.1103/revmodphys.45.22.
- Deb, B. M. (1974). "A simple mechanical model for molecular geometry based on the Hellmann-Feynman theorem. I. General principles and applications to AH2, AH3, AH4, HAB and ABC molecules". J. Am. Chem. Soc. 96 (7): 2030–2044. doi:10.1021/ja00814a009.
- Deb, B. M.; Bamzai, A. S. (1979). "Internal stresses in molecules. II. A local view of chemical binding in the H2 molecule". Mol. Phys. 38 (6): 2069–2097. doi:10.1080/00268977900103061.
- Deb, B. M.; Ghosh, S. K. (1979). "On some local force densities and stress tensors in molecular quantum mechanics". J. Phys. B: At. Mol. Phys. 12 (23): 3857–3872. Bibcode:1979JPhB...12.3857D. doi:10.1088/0022-3700/12/23/013.
- Bamzai, A. S.; Deb, B. M. (1981). "The role of single-particle density in chemistry". Rev. Mod. Phys. 53 (1): 95–126. Bibcode:1981RvMP...53...95B. doi:10.1103/revmodphys.53.95.
- Deb, B. M.; Ghosh, S. K. (1982). "Quantum fluid dynamics of many-electron systems in three-dimensional space". Int. J. Quantum Chem. 22 (5): 871–888. doi:10.1002/qua.560220503.
- Deb, B. M.; Ghosh, S. K. (1982). "Schrödinger fluid dynamics of many-electron systems in a time-dependent density-functional framework" (PDF). J. Chem. Phys. 77 (1): 342–348. Bibcode:1982JChPh..77..342D. doi:10.1063/1.443611.
- Ghosh, S. K.; Deb, B. M. (1982). "Densities, density functionals and electron fluids". Phys. Rep. 92 (1): 1–44. Bibcode:1982PhR....92....1G. doi:10.1016/0370-1573(82)90134-x.
- Deb, B. M.; Ghosh, S. K. (1983). "New method for the direct calculation of electron density in many-electron systems. I. Application to closed-shell atoms". Int. J. Quantum Chem. 23: 1–26. doi:10.1002/qua.560230104.
- Deb, B. M.; Ghosh, S. K. (1984). "Quantum fluid dynamics within a relativistic density functional framework". J. Phys. A. 17 (12): 2463–2473. Bibcode:1984JPhA...17.2463G. doi:10.1088/0305-4470/17/12/017. S2CID 15697272.
- Deb, B. M.; Chattaraj, P. K. (1984). "The role of kinetic energy in density-functional theory". J. Sci. Ind. Res. 43: 238–249.
- Deb, B. M.; Chattaraj, P. K. (1989). "Density functional and hydrodynamical approach to ion-atom collisions through a new generalized nonlinear Schrödinger equation". Phys. Rev. A. 39 (4): 1696–1713. Bibcode:1989PhRvA..39.1696D. doi:10.1103/physreva.39.1696. PMID 9901424.
- Deb, B. M.; Chattaraj, P. K. (1992). "Thomas-Fermi-type method for the direct calculation of electronic densities and properties of atoms and ions". Phys. Rev. A. 45 (3): 1412–1419. Bibcode:1992PhRvA..45.1412D. doi:10.1103/physreva.45.1412. PMID 9907122.
- Dey, B. K.; Deb, B. M. (1995). "Time-dependent quantum fluid dynamics of the photoionization of He atom under an intense laser field". Symposium on Thirty Years of Density Functional Theory 1994, Int. J. Quantum Chem. 56 (6): 707–732. doi:10.1002/qua.560560608.
- Singh, R.; Deb, B. M. (1996). "Density Functional calculation for doubly excited auto-ionizing states of helium atom". J. Chem. Phys. 104 (15): 5892–5897. Bibcode:1996JChPh.104.5892S. doi:10.1063/1.471321.
- Roy, A. K.; Singh, R.; Deb, B. M. (1997). "Density functional calculations for doubly excited states of He, Li+, Be++ and B+++". J. Phys. B: At. Mol. Opt. Phys. 30: 4763–4782. doi:10.1088/0953-4075/30/21/014. S2CID 250904326.
- Roy, A. K.; Dey, B. K.; Deb, B. M. (1999). "Direct calculation of ground-state electronic densities and properties of noble gas atoms through a single time-dependent hydrodynamical equation". Chem. Phys. Lett. 308 (5): 523–531. Bibcode:1999CPL...308..523R. doi:10.1016/S0009-2614(99)00612-0.
- Wadehra, A.; Deb, B. M. (2006). "Electron density changes and high harmonics generation in H_{2} molecule under intense laser fields". Eur. Phys. J. D. 39 (1): 141–155. Bibcode:2006EPJD...39..141W. doi:10.1140/epjd/e2006-00072-8. S2CID 122554952.
- Sadhukhan, M.; Panigrahi, P. K.; Deb, B. M. (2010). "Dynamics of hydrogen atom under a strong, time-dependent magnetic field". Europhys. Lett. 91 (2) 23001. Bibcode:2010EL.....9123001S. doi:10.1209/0295-5075/91/23001. S2CID 119410994.
- Sadhukhan, M.; Deb, B. M. (2011). "A dynamical signature of quantum chaos in hydrogen atom under strong, oscillating magnetic fields". Europhys. Lett. 94 (5) 50008. Bibcode:2011EL.....9450008S. doi:10.1209/0295-5075/94/50008. S2CID 122383206.
- Deb, B. M.; Mondal, D.; Bhattacharyya, S. P. (2014). "Predicting manoid molecules, a novel class of compounds". Indian J. Chem. 53A: 1317–1323.

== See also ==
- Charles Coulson
