= Robin Grimes =

British nuclear scientist

Sir Robin Grimes FRS FREng
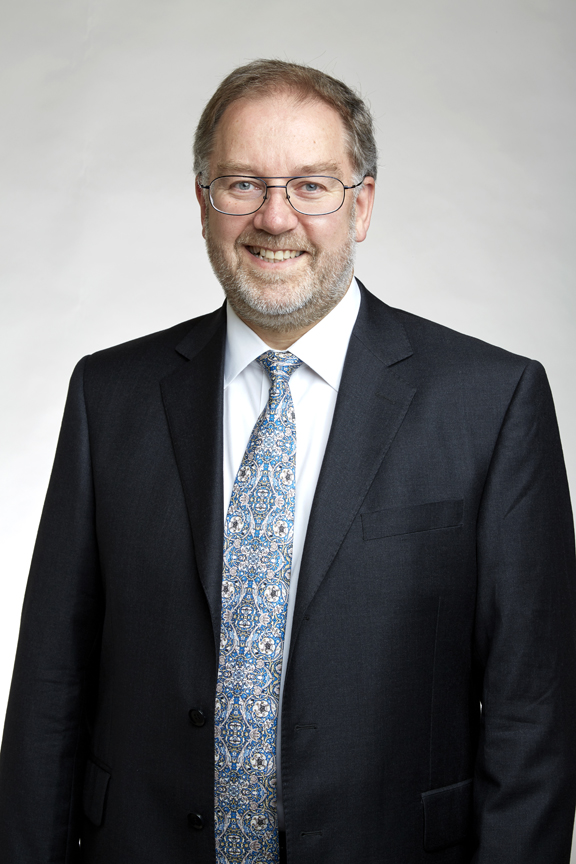
- Grimes in 2018
- Education: University of Nottingham (BSc); Case Western Reserve University; Keele University
- Scientific career
- Fields: Materials physics
- Workplaces: Imperial College London; Ministry of Defence; Foreign and Commonwealth Office
- Thesis: Quantum mechanical and classical modelling of defects in metal oxides. (1988)
- Doctoral advisor: Richard Catlow
- Website: imperial.ac.uk/people/r.grimes

Professor Sir Robin William Grimes is a British nuclear scientist who was chief scientific adviser in the Ministry of Defense (MoD) for nuclear science and technology and is a professor of materials physics at Imperial College London. From February 2013 to August 2018 he served as chief scientific adviser to the Foreign and Commonwealth Office (FCO). Since November 2021 he has been Foreign Secretary of The Royal Society

== Education ==
Grimes was educated at King Edward VI Camp Hill School for Boys in Kings Heath, Birmingham, University of Nottingham (BSc) and Case Western Reserve University (MS). He completed his PhD at Keele University for research supervised by Richard Catlow in 1988.

== Career and research ==
Grimes has used computer simulation and high performance computing (HPC) to predict the structural and dynamic behaviour of ceramics, metals and semiconductors for energy applications. This has allowed him to identify ways in which atomic scale defects modify materials properties. He has investigated a wide range of properties, including thermal conductivity and how materials deform but also how atoms are transported through solids. While best known for modelling nuclear materials, he has worked as much on electrochemical systems, optical and electronic materials.

Grimes established science diplomacy within the Foreign and Commonwealth Office working as chief scientific adviser. He has mainstreamed science as a tool in the UK's diplomatic tool box, using science evidence and science networks to place science collaboration as the heart of key international relationships. He maintains a leading role in the nuclear power academic community.

== Awards and honours ==
Grimes was elected a Fellow of the Royal Society (FRS) in 2018 and a Fellow of the Royal Academy of Engineering (FREng) in 2013.

He was knighted in the 2022 New Year Honours for services to UK resilience and international science relationships. In April 2022, Grimes was awarded an honorary doctorate by Aston University in Birmingham.

In July 2024, Grimes was awarded an Honorary Doctorate by Lancaster University.
