= Friedrich Seitz =

German Romantic Era composer

Friedrich Seitz (12 June 1848, Günthersleben-Wechmar, Saxe-Coburg and Gotha – 22 May 1918) was a German Romantic Era composer. He was a violinist who served as a concertmaster, who wrote chamber music and eight student concertos for the violin.

== Life ==
Seitz was born in Frankfurt in 1848 and began studying music at a young age. He received his musical education at the Frankfurt Conservatory, where he studied with some of the leading musicians of the day. Seitz studied violin under Karl Wilhelm Uhlrich in Sondershausen, Germany; he later married Uhlrich's daughter. He became a student of Johann Christoph Lauterbach in 1874. He became music director at Sondershausen and thereafter became a concertmaster at Magdeburg. In 1884 he was the Hofkonzertmeister (conductor of the court orchestra) at Dessau.

Seitz was also a highly respected violinist and taught at several music academies during his career. He was known for his technical proficiency and expressive playing style, and many of his students went on to become successful musicians in their own right. He wrote all his violin concertos for his students, to help them improve their technique.

Seitz was a prolific composer and wrote a wide range of music, including operas, symphonies, chamber music, and solo works for various instruments. However, it is his violin concertos that are perhaps his most enduring works. Movements from Seitz's student concerti (No. 2 and No. 5) have become more widely known by virtue of their inclusion in the Suzuki violin method instructional material.

== Selected compositions ==
- Schüler-Konzert Nr. 1 (Pupil's Concerto No. 1) in D major for violin and piano, Op. 7
- Schüler-Konzert Nr. 2 (Pupil's Concerto No. 2) in G major for violin and piano, Op. 13
- Schüler-Konzert Nr. 3 (Pupil's Concerto No. 3) in G minor for violin and piano, Op. 12
- Schüler-Konzert Nr. 4 (Pupil's Concerto No. 4) in D major for violin and piano, Op. 15
- Sechs leichte Vortragsstücke in Form einer Suite f. V. od. Vcello (1. Lage) m. Pfte. Magdeburg, Rathke. 1896.

1. Frohe Wanderschaft (A Pleasant Walk)
2. In der Waldmühle (The Woodland Mill)
3. Bei der Grossmutter (With Grandmother)
4. Zigeuner kommen (Gipsies Are Coming)
5. Auf dem Kinderball (The Children's Ball)
6. Sehnsucht nach der Heimat (Longing for Home)

- Schüler-Klaviertrio Nr. 1 (Pupil's Piano Trio No. 1) in C major for violin, cello and piano, Op. 18
- Romanze und Intermezzo, Op. 21
- Schüler-Konzert Nr. 5 (Pupil's Concerto No. 5) in D major for violin and piano, Op. 22 (1909)
- Konzert in einem Satz zum Studium und Konzertgebrauch (Concerto in One Movement for Study and Concert Use) in A minor for violin and piano or orchestra, Op. 25
- Drei Grabgesänge für gefallene Krieger for mixed chorus, Op. 28; poetry by August Sieghardt
- Schüler-Konzert Nr. 6 (Pupil's Concerto No. 6) in G major for violin and piano, Op. 31
- Schüler-Konzert Nr. 7 (Pupil's Concerto No. 7) in D minor for violin and piano, Op. 32
- Quartet in G Major for 2 violins (or violin and viola), cello and piano, Op. 35
- Konzertstück (Concert Piece) in A major for violin and piano, Op. 36
- Schüler-Konzert Nr. 8 (Pupil's Concerto No. 8) in G major for violin and piano, Op. 38
- Short works for violin and piano (Opp. 41, 45, 46)
- Ungarische Rhapsodie (Hungarian Rhapsody) for violin and piano, Op. 47
- Schüler-Konzert Nr. 8 [sic] (Pupil's Concerto No. 8) in A major for violin and piano, Op. 51
- Die Passion, Oratorio for soloists, chorus, orchestra and organ
- Zwei neue Vortragsstücke for violin and piano

1. Andante espressivo
2. Allegro vivace

- Schüler-Klaviertrio Nr. 2 (Pupil's Piano Trio No. 2) for violin, cello and piano
- Schüler-Klaviertrio Nr. 3 (Pupil's Piano Trio No. 3) for violin, cello and piano
