= Richard Catlow =

British chemist

Sir Richard Catlow FRS FRSC FInstP
- Born: Charles Richard Arthur Catlow; 24 April 1947 (age 79); Simonstone, Lancashire, England
- Education: University of Oxford (BA, DPhil)
- Scientific career
- Fields: Chemistry; Physics; Materials Science; Crystallography; Computational science
- Workplaces: University College London; Royal Institution
- Thesis: Defect structures in fluorite crystals (1973)
- Doctoral advisor: Alan Lidiard
- Doctoral students: Robin Grimes, Saiful Islam
- Website: profiles.ucl.ac.uk/5952-richard-catlow

Sir Charles Richard Arthur Catlow FRS FRSC FInstP FLSW (born 24 April 1947) is a British chemist and professor at University College London and Cardiff University. Previously, he was Director of the Davy-Faraday Research Laboratory (1998–2007), and Wolfson Professor of Natural Philosophy at the Royal Institution. Since 2016, he has served as the foreign secretary of the Royal Society., and since 2021 as President of the InterAcademy Partnership (IAP).

== Education ==
He earned a Bachelor of Arts honours degree in 1970 and a Doctor of Philosophy degree in 1974, from St John's College, University of Oxford.

== Career and research ==
Catlow has developed and applied computer models to solid state and materials chemistry. By combining his computational methods with experiments, Catlow has made contributions to areas as diverse as catalysis and mineralogy.

His approach has advanced understanding of how defects (missing or extra atoms) in the structure of solids can result in non-stoichiometric compounds. Such compounds have special electrical or chemical properties since their contributing elements are present in slightly different proportions to those predicted by chemical formulae.

Catlow's work has offered insight into mechanisms of industrial catalysts, especially involving microporous materials and metal oxides. In structural chemistry and mineralogy, simulation methods are now routinely used to predict the structures of complex solids and silicates respectively, following Catlow's demonstrations of their power.

=== Awards and honours ===
In December 2014, Catlow was the winner of the Gerhard Ertl Lecture at the Fritz Haber Institute of the Max Planck Society in Berlin. He was elected a Fellow of the Royal Society (FRS) in 2004 and a Fellow of the Royal Society of Chemistry (FRSC). In 2017, Catlow was elected a Fellow of the Learned Society of Wales. In 2020, he was awarded the Faraday Lectureship Prize from the Royal Society of Chemistry. Catlow was knighted in the 2020 Birthday Honours for services to leadership in science and research.

Catlow was awarded an Honorary Doctorate of Science (Dsc) by the University of Bath in July 2022. The award recognised the ever-growing impact of Catlow's research, 'particularly in the context of the global challenge of climate change.'
