= Charles Coulson =

British applied mathematician, theoretical chemist and religious author (1910–1974)

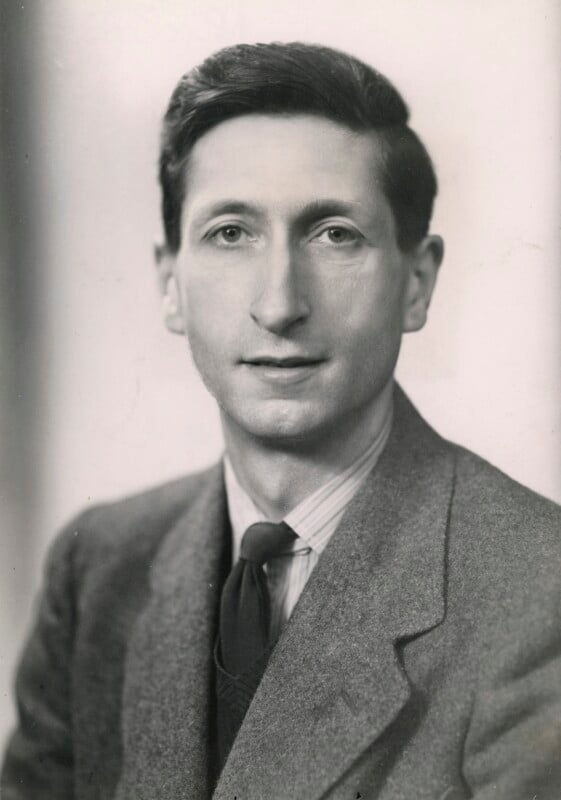
- Coulson in 1950
- Born: Charles Alfred Coulson; 13 December 1910; Dudley, England
- Died: 7 January 1974 (aged 63); Oxford, England
- Education: University of Cambridge
- Known for: Bent bond Coulson–Fischer theory Chirgwin–Coulson weights
- Awards: Tilden Prize (1951); Faraday Lectureship Prize (1968); Davy Medal (1970)
- Scientific career
- Fields: Mathematics, Chemistry, Physics
- Workplaces: University of Oxford; King's College London
- Doctoral advisor: Sir John Lennard-Jones
- Doctoral students: David Eisenberg; Peter Higgs; Raphael David Levine; H. Christopher Longuet-Higgins; John Maddox; Roy McWeeny; Bidyendu Mohan Deb; George Stanley Rushbrooke; Alan Lidiard

Charles Alfred Coulson FRS FRSE (13 December 1910 – 7 January 1974) was a British applied mathematician and theoretical chemist.

Coulson's major scientific work was as a pioneer of the application of the quantum theory of valency to problems of molecular structure, dynamics and reactivity. He was also a Methodist lay preacher, served on the World Council of Churches from 1962 to 1968, and was chairman of Oxfam from 1965 to 1971.

== Early life ==
The parents of Charles Coulson and his younger twin brother John Metcalfe Coulson were educators who hailed from the Midlands. The twins were born when their father, Alfred, was principal of Dudley Technical College and superintendent of the Methodist Sunday School, and their mother Annie Sincere Hancock was Headmistress of Tipton Elementary School, close by. Coulson's parents maintained a religious Methodist home.

When the Coulson brothers were 10, their father was appointed superintendent of technical colleges for the South-West of England, and the family moved to Bristol. When Charles was 13 he was awarded a scholarship to Clifton College in Bristol, which placed a strong emphasis on science and mathematics.

Coulson's academic success at Clifton earned him an entrance scholarship in mathematics to Trinity College, Cambridge in 1928.

His brother John also excelled at school, and went on to become professor of chemical engineering at Newcastle University, and author of a major series of texts on chemical engineering.

== The Cambridge years ==
At Cambridge, Coulson first studied the Mathematics Tripos. He was awarded a College Senior Scholarship during his studies, and received a First Class in the university examinations in 1931. He continued to take the Physics Part II examination a year later, receiving another First. He was awarded several college and university prizes during his undergraduate days. Lord Rutherford, J. J. Thomson, A. S. Besicovitch, Sir Arthur Eddington, G. H. Hardy, J. E. Littlewood, F. P. Ramsey and Ebenezer Cunningham were amongst his teachers.

In 1932, Coulson started graduate work with R. H. Fowler but switched to Sir John Lennard-Jones, and was awarded a Ph.D. in 1936 for work on the electronic structure of methane. By this time, he had published 11 papers. He continued as a research fellow at Cambridge for another two years.

Coulson was accredited as a lay preacher in 1929, but he said his religion was perfunctory until a particular event in 1930, which he described in a documented sermon that he gave the following year. His religious beliefs were influenced by the physicist Sir Arthur Eddington, the theologian Charles Raven and, in particular, by Alex(ander) Wood, Fellow of Emmanuel College, authority on acoustics and pacifist, and Labour parliamentary candidate.

On the social side, Eileen Florence Burrett was studying in Cambridge to become a school teacher when Charles was an undergraduate. They came together in meetings of the University Methodists. They married in 1938, and had four children, two boys and two girls.

== St. Andrews and Oxford before King's ==
In 1939, Coulson was appointed as senior lecturer in mathematics at University College, Dundee. Administratively, this was still part of the University of St. Andrews. Coulson was a conscientious objector during World War II. He carried a very heavy work load, teaching mathematics, physics and chemistry. E. T. Copson was head of department, on the main St. Andrews campus. Coulson collaborated with C. E. Duncanson at University College, London, brought George Stanley Rushbrooke from Cambridge and acted technically as his Ph.D. supervisor, and wrote the first edition of Waves.

In 1941 he was elected a Fellow of the Royal Society of Edinburgh, and in 1950 as a Fellow of the Royal Society of London.

In 1945, Coulson became a lecturer in physical chemistry at Oxford University, attached to University College and, concurrently, held a Fellowship awarded by Imperial Chemical Industries. Coulson's students at Oxford included:

- H. Christopher Longuet-Higgins, later a professor at Cambridge, then Edinburgh.
- John Maddox, who went with Coulson to King's College, London, turned to publishing and was knighted.
- Roy McWeeny, later, a professor at Sheffield and then Pisa.
- William E. (Bill) Moffitt, later on the chemistry faculty at Harvard.

== King's College, London ==
In 1947, Coulson accepted a university chair in theoretical physics at King's College London. A news item in Nature described him as "among the foremost workers in Great Britain on the wave-mechanical side of quantum theory". It extolled his breadth of interests that took in the action of radiation on bacteria and the theory of liquids and solutions, besides the molecular orbital treatment of small molecules and ions, the approximation methods needed for large organic molecules for studies of bond lengths in coronene and conductivity of graphite, chemical reactivity, the treatment of momentum distribution functions and Compton-line profiles and his "well deserved reputation for his kindly and helpful encouragement of younger research workers."

Initially, Coulson's group were assigned offices on the top floor of a building (reached by a rickety wooden staircase) that overlooked the Strand, with considerable benefit when cavalcades paraded by on Lord Mayor's Day and Royal occasions. In 1952, the group moved down to offices in the new Physics Department, interspersed with Biophysics and other experimental groups. With developments in computing opening new vistas for the theoreticians, along with the developments in laboratory methods, the entire department enjoyed the intellectual ferment of the 1950s.

In his account of the official opening of the new Physics Department, Maurice Wilkins wrote: "the theoretical group deals with applications of wave mechanics and statistical mechanics ... the theory of the chemical bond ... questions of chemical reactivity ... stability of crystal structures, biological properties of cancer-producing compounds and other molecules, electrical and magnetic properties of metals, ... properties of electrolytes and colloidal solutions, including ... electrophoresis ... more than one hundred papers have been published during the past five years."

Coulson's group consisted of (1) graduate students who conducted research on electronic structure and valence theory, for a Ph.D. degree directly under Coulson's supervision, (2) students working for a Ph.D. in statistical thermodynamics under the supervision of Fred Booth and, later, in nuclear physics supervised by Louis Elton and then Dr. Percy, (3) students working for an M.Sc. on topics in applied mathematics to be followed by a Ph.D. with another supervisor in the Mathematics Department, and (4) visitors, some of whom held senior academic and industrial appointments. The valence theory Ph.D. students included Simon J. Altmann, Michael P Barnett, Aagje Bozeman, Peter J. Davies, Harry H. Greenwood, Peter Higgs, Julianne Jacobs, Roland Lefebvre, George Lester, John Maddox, Norman H. March, and Robert Taylor. Statistical mechanics was pursued by Geoffrey V. Chester, John Enderby, Alec Gaines and Alan B. Lidiard. The students who went on to the Mathematics Department included Godfrey Lance, Eric Milner and Geoffrey Sewell. Collectively, these wrote nearly 30 books in later years. Visitors who stayed for months included Professor Inga Fischer-Hjalmars of the University of Stockholm, Dr. John van der Waals of Shell Oil, and Dr. Joop der Heer from the University of Amsterdam.

== Oxford after King's ==
In 1952, Coulson was appointed Rouse Ball Professor of Mathematics and Fellow of Wadham College at the University of Oxford. The chair was held previously by E. A. Milne, the mathematician and astrophysicist, and Roger Penrose succeeded Coulson. His inaugural lecture expressed the following view of applied mathematics: "an intellectual adventure in which are combined creative imagination and authentic canons of beauty and fitness; they combine to give us insight into the nature of that world of which we ourselves, and our minds, are part."

Coulson was active in the formation of the Mathematical Institute, and soon became its director. On the institute website Coulson is described as "a man who packed into his life twice as much as any normal academic person ... he had a gift for lucid exposition and was ... indefatigable in his work, not only for science and mathematics, but also on behalf of people, whether black or white, young or old."

In 1972, Coulson was appointed to the newly created chair of theoretical chemistry.

== Books and journals ==
Coulson wrote several books. Valence, first published in 1952, and also reissued posthumously, was the most influential. Coulson also wrote popular works on atomic and molecular structure:

- Waves (1941)
- Electricity (1948)
- The Place of Science as a Cohesive Force in Modern Society (1951)
- Christianity in an Age of science (1953)

Coulson was a founder member of the board of the journal Molecular Physics and its first editor.

== Religious and social activities ==
Beside his scientific works, Coulson was a committed Christian, and served as a Methodist local preacher. He wrote Science, Technology and the Christian (1953) and Science and Christian Belief (1955), integrating his scientific and religious views. Coulson apparently coined the phrase God of the gaps. Coulson believed religious faith was essential for the responsible use of science. He was a pacifist and conscientious objector, but championed the development of nuclear energy. He encouraged scientists to help improve Third World food production. He was chairman of Oxfam from 1965 to 1971. Charles' widest religious impact on the general public was in his BBC broadcasts. In these, and in general interaction with people, he conveyed his religiosity in a gentle and sometimes humorous manner, for example, when he claimed in his inaugural lecture at King's College, that he had received mail addressed to him as professor of theological physics.

== Death ==
After a period of declining health, Coulson died in his sleep in the early hours of 7 January 1974. He was 63 and had lived in Oxford at the time.

== See also ==
- Coulson–Fischer theory
- Chirgwin–Coulson weights
- Bent's rule
- Valence bond theory
- Molecular orbital
- List of science and religion scholars
- List of chemists
