= International Journal of Quantum Chemistry =

- Discipline: Quantum chemistry
- Language: English

Publication details
- History: 1967-present
- Publisher: John Wiley & Sons
- Frequency: 24/year
- Open access: Hybrid
- Impact factor: 2.444 (2020)

Standard abbreviations
- ISO 4: Int. J. Quantum Chem.

Indexing
- CODEN: IJQCB2
- ISSN: 0020-7608 (print); 1097-461X (web)
- OCLC no.: 1753588

Links
- Journal homepage; Online access; Online archive

The International Journal of Quantum Chemistry is a peer-reviewed scientific journal publishing original, primary research and review articles on all aspects of quantum chemistry, including an expanded scope focusing on aspects of materials science, biochemistry, biophysics, quantum physics, quantum information theory, etc.

According to the Journal Citation Reports, the journal has a 2020 impact factor of 2.444.

It was established in 1967 by Per-Olov Löwdin. In 2011, the journal moved to an in-house editorial office model, in which a permanent team of full-time, professional editors is responsible for article scrutiny and editorial content.
