= Lyman limit =

Wavelength associated with hydrogen ionisation

In physics and chemistry, the Lyman limit is the short-wavelength end of the Lyman series of hydrogen emission lines at 91.13 nm (911.3 Å). It indicates the energy emitted by an electron which is transferred from n=∞ to n=1. The associated photon energy, 13.6 eV, corresponds to the energy required for an electron in the hydrogen ground state to escape from the electric potential barrier that originally confined it, known as the ionization energy of Hydrogen, thus creating a hydrogen ion. This energy is equivalent to the Rydberg constant.

== See also ==
- Lyman–Werner photons
- Balmer series
- Balmer break
- Lyman-break galaxy
- Lyman-alpha emitter
- Lyman-alpha forest
