= Rydberg–Ritz combination principle =

Principle of spectral lines

The Rydberg–Ritz combination principle is an empirical rule proposed by Walther Ritz in 1908 to describe the relationship of the spectral lines for all atoms, as a generalization of an earlier rule by Johannes Rydberg for the hydrogen atom and the alkali metals. The principle states that the spectral lines of any element include frequencies that are either the sum or the difference of the frequencies of two other lines. Lines of the spectra of elements could be predicted from existing lines. Since the frequency of light is proportional to the wavenumber or reciprocal wavelength, the principle can also be expressed in terms of wavenumbers which are the sum or difference of wavenumbers of two other lines.

Another related version is that the wavenumber or reciprocal wavelength of each spectral line can be written as the difference of two terms. The simplest example is the hydrogen atom, described by the Rydberg formula

$$\frac{1}{\lambda} = R\left(\frac{1}{n_1^2}-\frac{1}{n_2^2}\right)$$

where $\lambda$ is the wavelength, $R$ is the Rydberg constant, and $n_1$ and $n_2$ are positive integers such that $n_1 < n_2$. This is the difference of two terms of form $T_n = \frac{R_H}{n^2}$.

The exact Ritz Combination formula was mathematically derived from this where:

$$\tilde{\nu} \;=\; \frac{1}{\lambda},$$

$$\tilde{\nu} = A- \frac{N}{(m+{\alpha}+{\beta}({\alpha}-\tilde{\nu}))^2}$$

Where:

$\tilde{\nu}$ is the wavenumber,

$A$ is the limit of the series,

$N$ is a universal constant, (now known as R)

$m$ is the numeral, (now known as n)

${\alpha}$ and ${\beta}$ are constants.

== Relation to quantum theory ==
The combination principle is explained using quantum theory. Light consists of photons whose energy E is proportional to the frequency ν and wavenumber of the light: E = hν = hc/λ (where h is the Planck constant, c is the speed of light, and λ is the wavelength). A combination of frequencies or wavenumbers is then equivalent to a combination of energies.

According to the quantum theory of the hydrogen atom proposed by Niels Bohr in 1913, an atom can have only certain energy levels. Absorption or emission of a particle of light or photon corresponds to a transition between two possible energy levels, and the photon energy equals the difference between their two energies. On dividing by hc, the photon wavenumber equals the difference between two terms, each equal to an energy divided by hc or an energy in wavenumber units (cm^{−1}). Energy levels of atoms and molecules are today described by term symbols which indicate their quantum numbers.

Also, a transition from an initial to a final energy level involves the same energy change whether it occurs in a single step or in two steps via an intermediate state. The energy of transition in a single step is the sum of the energies of transition in two steps: (E_{3} – E_{1}) = (E_{2} – E_{1}) + (E_{3} – E_{2}).

The NIST database tables of lines of spectra contains observed lines and the lines calculated by use of the Ritz combination principle.

== History ==
The spectral lines of hydrogen had been analyzed and found to have a mathematical relationship in the Balmer series. This was later extended to a general formula called the Rydberg formula. This could only be applied to hydrogen-like atoms. In 1908 Ritz derived a relationship that could be applied to all atoms which he calculated prior to the first 1913 quantum atom and his ideas are based on classical mechanics. This principle, the Rydberg–Ritz combination principle, is used today in identifying the transition lines of atoms.
