= Excited state =

Quantum state of a system

After absorbing energy, an electron may jump from the ground state to a higher energy excited state.

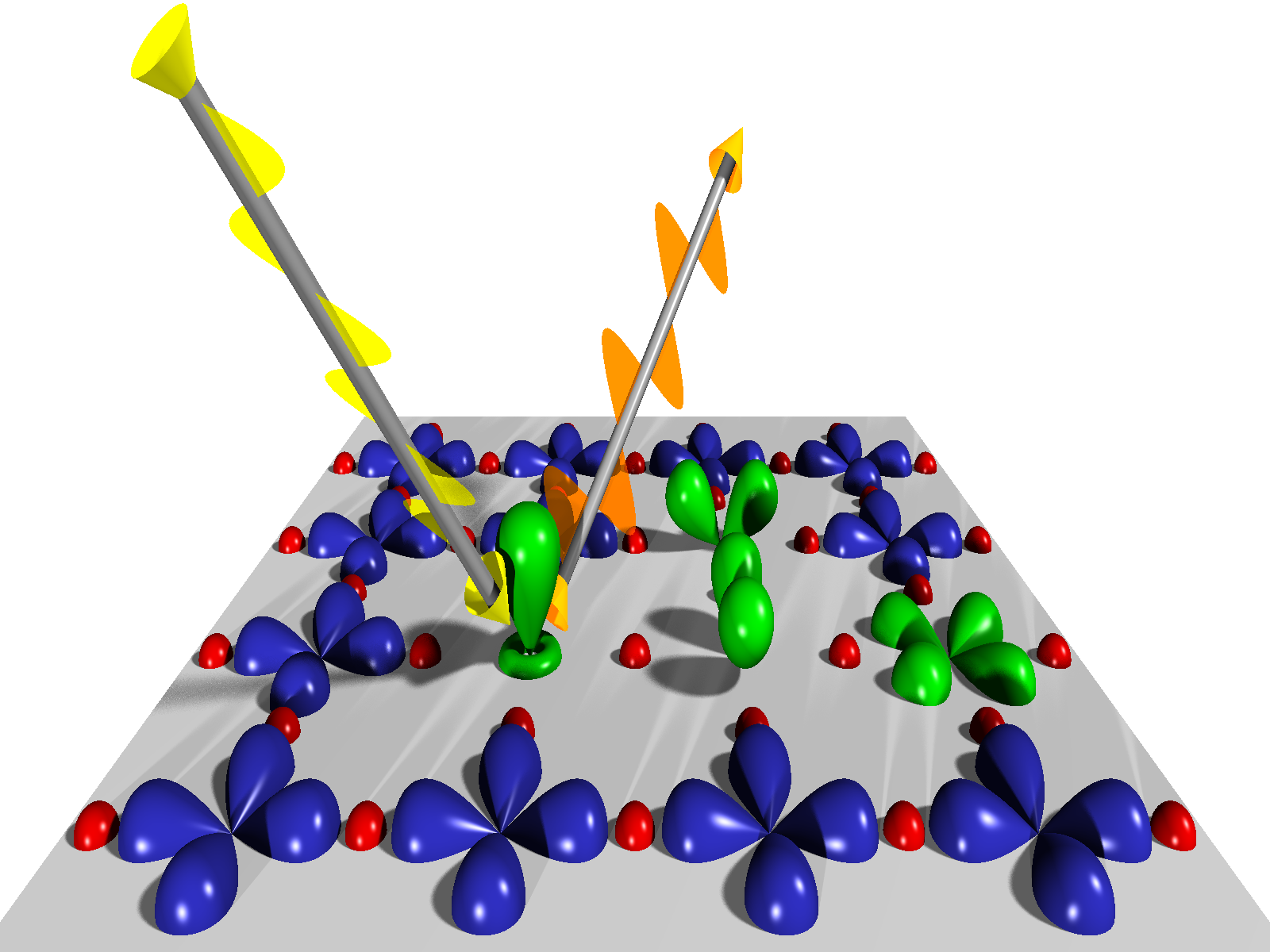
Excitations of copper 3d orbitals on the CuO_{2} plane of a high-T_{c} superconductor. The ground state (blue) is x^{2}–y^{2} orbitals; the excited orbitals are in green; the arrows illustrate inelastic x-ray spectroscopy.

In quantum mechanics, an excited state of a system (such as an atom, molecule or nucleus) is any quantum state of the system that has a higher energy than the ground state (that is, more energy than the absolute minimum). Excitation refers to an increase in energy level above a chosen starting point, usually the ground state, but sometimes an already excited state. The temperature of a group of particles is indicative of the level of excitation (with the notable exception of systems that exhibit negative temperature).

The lifetime of a system in an excited state is usually short: spontaneous or induced emission of a quantum of energy (such as a photon or a phonon) usually occurs shortly after the system is promoted to the excited state, returning the system to a state with lower energy (a less excited state or the ground state). This return to a lower energy level is known as de-excitation and is the inverse of excitation.

Long-lived excited states are often called metastable. Long-lived nuclear isomers and singlet oxygen are two examples of this.

== Atomic excitation ==
Atoms can be excited by heat, electricity, or light (photoexcitation). The hydrogen atom provides a simple example of this concept.

The ground state of the hydrogen atom has the atom's single electron in the lowest possible orbital (that is, the spherically symmetric "1s" wave function, which, so far, has been demonstrated to have the lowest possible quantum numbers). By giving the atom additional energy (for example, by absorption of a photon of an appropriate energy), the electron moves into an excited state (one with one or more quantum numbers greater than the minimum possible). When the electron finds itself between two states—a shift which happens very fast—it's in a superposition of both states. If the photon has too much energy, the electron will cease to be bound to the atom, and the atom will become ionized (photoionization).

After excitation the atom may return to the ground state or a lower excited state, by emitting a photon with a characteristic energy. Emission of photons from atoms in various excited states leads to an electromagnetic spectrum showing a series of characteristic emission lines (including, in the case of the hydrogen atom, the Lyman, Balmer, Paschen and Brackett series).

An atom in a high excited state is termed a Rydberg atom. A system of highly excited atoms can form a long-lived condensed excited state, Rydberg matter.

== Perturbed gas excitation ==
A collection of molecules forming a gas can be considered in an excited state if one or more molecules are elevated to kinetic energy levels such that the resulting velocity distribution departs from the equilibrium Boltzmann distribution. This phenomenon has been studied in the case of a two-dimensional gas in some detail, analyzing the time taken to relax to equilibrium.

== Calculation of excited states ==
Excited states are often calculated using coupled cluster, Møller–Plesset perturbation theory, multi-configurational self-consistent field, configuration interaction, and time-dependent density functional theory. When using variational Monte Carlo methods, which are usually applied only to the ground state, excited states can be calculated either by penalty methods, or the Natural Excited States method, also known as Grassmann VMC.

== Excited-state absorption ==
The excitation of a system (an atom or molecule) from one excited state to a higher-energy excited state with the absorption of a photon is called excited-state absorption (ESA). Excited-state absorption is possible only when an electron has been already excited from the ground state to a lower excited state. The excited-state absorption is usually an undesired effect, but it can be useful in upconversion pumping. Excited-state absorption measurements are done using pump–probe techniques such as flash photolysis. However, it is not easy to measure them compared to ground-state absorption, and in some cases complete bleaching of the ground state is required to measure excited-state absorption.

== Reaction ==
A further consequence of excited-state formation may be reaction of the atom or molecule in its excited state, as in photochemistry.

== See also ==
- Rydberg formula
- Stationary state
- Repulsive state
