= Johann Jakob Balmer =

Swiss mathematician (1825–1898)

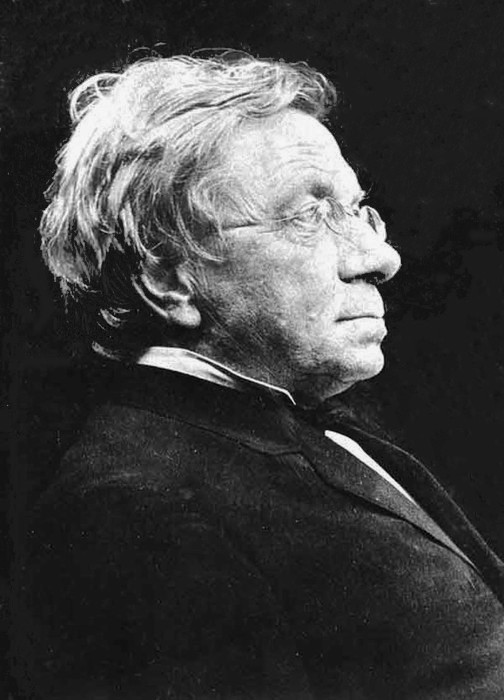
- Born: 1 May 1825; Lausen, Switzerland
- Died: 12 March 1898 (aged 72); Basel, Switzerland
- Education: University of Basel
- Scientific career
- Fields: Mathematics

Johann Jakob Balmer (1 May 1825 – 12 March 1898) was a Swiss mathematician best known for his work in physics, the Balmer series of the hydrogen atom.

== Early life and education ==
Balmer was born on 1 May 1825 in Lausen, Switzerland, the son of a chief justice also named Johann Jakob Balmer. His mother was Elizabeth Rolle Balmer, and he was the oldest son. During his schooling he excelled in mathematics, and so he decided to focus on that field when he attended university.

He studied at the University of Karlsruhe and the University of Berlin, then completed his PhD from the University of Basel in 1849 with a dissertation on the cycloid.

== Career ==
Johann then spent his entire life in Basel, where he taught at a school for girls. He also lectured at the University of Basel. In 1850 he married Christine Pauline Rinck. The couple had 3 children.

Despite being a mathematician, Balmer is best remembered for his work on spectral series. His major contribution (made at the age of sixty, in 1885) was an empirical formula for the visible spectral lines of the hydrogen atom, the study of which he took up at the suggestion of Eduard Hagenbach also of Basel. Using Ångström's measurements of the hydrogen lines, he arrived at a formula for computing the wavelength as follows:

$$\lambda\ = h \, \frac{ n^2 }{ n^2 - m^2 }$$

for m = 2 and n = 3, 4, 5, 6, and so forth; h = 3.6456 · 10^{−7} m = 364.56 nm.

In his 1885 notice, he referred to h as the "fundamental number of hydrogen." Today, h is known as the Balmer constant. Balmer used his formula to predict the wavelength for n = 7:

$\lambda\ = (364.56 \, {\rm nm}) \cdot \, \frac{ 7^2 }{ \, 7^2 - 2^2 \, } \simeq 397.0 \, {\rm nm}$

Hagenbach informed Balmer that Ångström had observed a line with wavelength 397 nm. This portion of the hydrogen emission spectrum, from transitions in electron energy levels with n ≥ 3 to n = 2, became known as the Balmer series.

The Balmer lines refer to the emission lines that occur within the visible region of the hydrogen emission spectrum at 410.29 nm, 434.17 nm, 486.27 nm, and 656.47 nm. These lines are caused by electrons in an excited state emitting a photon and returning to the first excited state of the hydrogen atom (n = 2).

Two of Balmer's colleagues, Hermann Wilhelm Vogel and William Huggins, were able to confirm the existence of other lines of the Balmer series in the spectrum of hydrogen in white stars.

Balmer's formula was later found to be a special case of the Rydberg formula, devised by Johannes Rydberg in 1888:

$$\frac{1}{\lambda}\ = \frac{4}{h} \left( \frac{1}{m^2} - \frac{1}{n^2} \right)= R_H \left( \frac{1}{m^2} - \frac{1}{n^2} \right)$$

with $R_H$ being the Rydberg constant for hydrogen, $m=2$ for Balmer's formula, and $n>m$.

A full explanation of why these formulas worked, however, had to wait until 18 years after Balmer's death with the presentation of the Bohr model of the atom by Niels Bohr in 1913.

Johann Balmer died in Basel on 12 March 1898, aged 72.

== Honors ==
- Balmer formula and Balmer constant h are named after him, as well as Balmer lines and Balmer series.
- The Balmer jump is useful in astronomy for stellar classification.
- The crater Balmer on the Moon is named after him.
- Minor planet 12755 Balmer is named after him.
