= Emission spectrum =

Frequencies of light emitted by atoms or chemical compounds

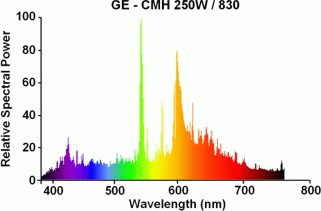
Emission spectrum of a ceramic metal halide lamp.

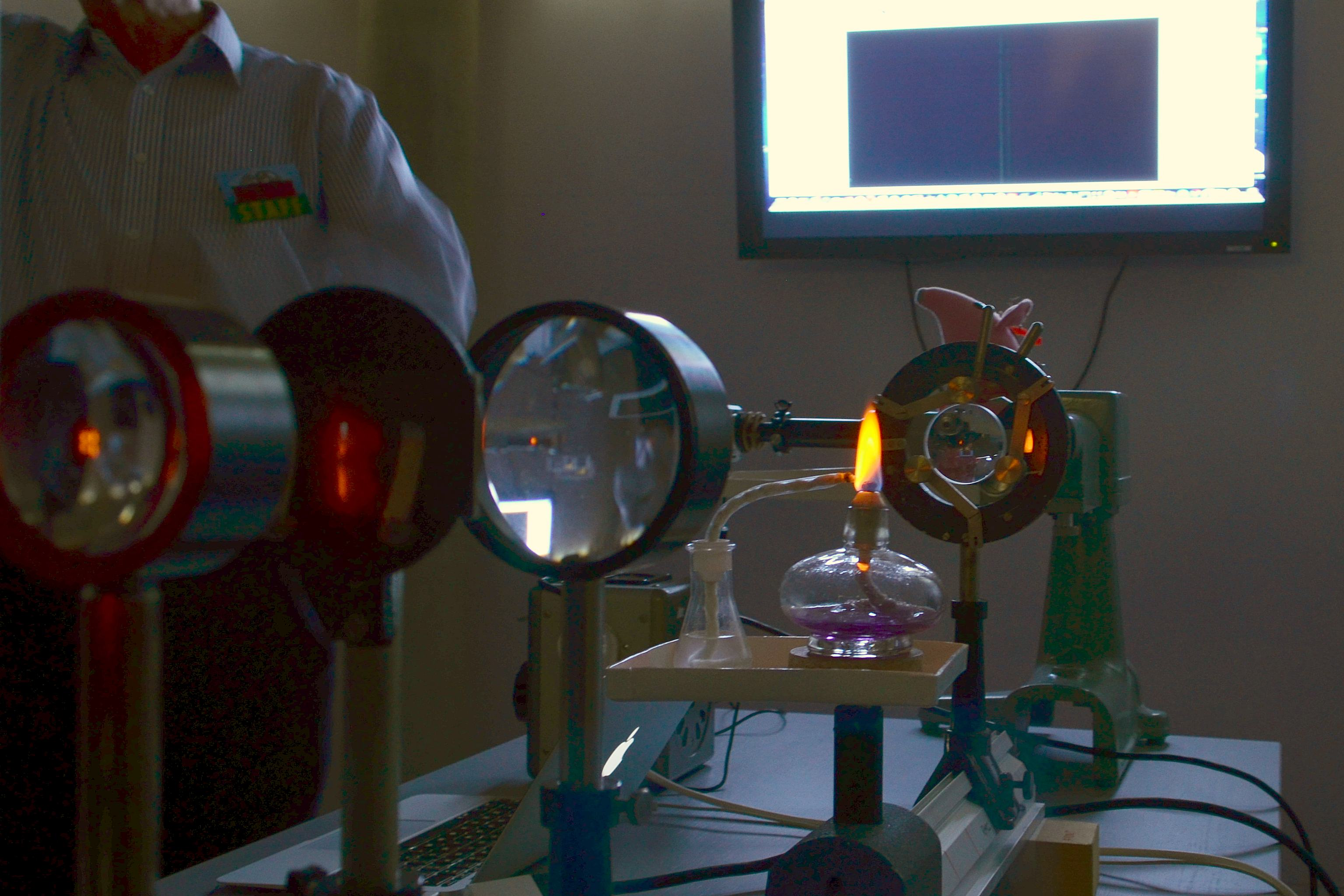
A demonstration of the 589 nm D_{2} (left) and 590 nm D_{1} (right) emission sodium D lines using a wick with salt water in a flame

The emission spectrum of a chemical element or chemical compound is the spectrum of frequencies of electromagnetic radiation emitted due to electrons making a transition from a high energy state to a lower energy state. The photon energy of the emitted photons is equal to the energy difference between the two states. There are many possible electron transitions for each atom, and each transition has a specific energy difference. This collection of different transitions, leading to different radiated wavelengths, make up an emission spectrum. Each element's emission spectrum is unique. Therefore, spectroscopy can be used to identify elements in matter of unknown composition. Similarly, the emission spectra of molecules can be used in chemical analysis of substances.

== Emission ==
In physics, emission is the process by which a higher energy quantum mechanical state of a particle becomes converted to a lower one through the emission of a photon, resulting in the production of light. The frequency of light emitted is a function of the energy of the transition.

Since energy must be conserved, the energy difference between the two states equals the energy carried off by the photon. The energy states of the transitions can lead to emissions over a very large range of frequencies. For example, visible light is emitted by the coupling of electronic states in atoms and molecules (then the phenomenon is called fluorescence or phosphorescence). On the other hand, nuclear shell transitions can emit high energy gamma rays, while nuclear spin transitions emit low energy radio waves.

The emittance of an object quantifies how much light is emitted by it. This may be related to other properties of the object through the Stefan–Boltzmann law. For most substances, the amount of emission varies with the temperature and the spectroscopic composition of the object, leading to the appearance of color temperature and emission lines. Precise measurements at many wavelengths allow the identification of a substance via emission spectroscopy.

Emission of radiation is typically described using semi-classical quantum mechanics: the particle's energy levels and spacings are determined from quantum mechanics, and light is treated as an oscillating electric field that can drive a transition if it is in resonance with the system's natural frequency. The quantum mechanics problem is treated using time-dependent perturbation theory and leads to the general result known as Fermi's golden rule. The description has been superseded by quantum electrodynamics, although the semi-classical version continues to be more useful in most practical computations.

== Origins ==
When the electrons in the atom are excited, for example by being heated, the additional energy pushes the electrons to higher energy orbitals. When the electrons fall back down and leave the excited state, energy is re-emitted in the form of a photon. The wavelength (or equivalently, frequency) of the photon is determined by the difference in energy between the two states. These emitted photons form the element's spectrum.

The fact that only certain colors appear in an element's atomic emission spectrum means that only certain frequencies of light are emitted. Each of these frequencies are related to energy by the formula:

E_{photon} = hν,

where E_{photon} is the energy of the photon, ν is its frequency, and h is the Planck constant. This concludes that only photons with specific energies are emitted by the atom. The principle of the atomic emission spectrum explains the varied colors in neon signs, as well as chemical flame test results (described below).

The frequencies of light that an atom can emit are dependent on states the electrons can be in. When excited, an electron moves to a higher energy level or orbital. When the electron falls back to its ground level the light is emitted.

Emission spectrum of hydrogen

The above picture shows the visible light emission spectrum for hydrogen. If only a single atom of hydrogen were present, then only a single wavelength would be observed at a given instant. Several of the possible emissions are observed because the sample contains many hydrogen atoms that are in different initial energy states and reach different final energy states. These different combinations lead to simultaneous emissions at different wavelengths.

Emission spectrum of iron

=== Radiation from molecules ===
As well as the electronic transitions discussed above, the energy of a molecule can also change via rotational, vibrational, and vibronic (combined vibrational and electronic) transitions. These energy transitions often lead to closely spaced groups of many different spectral lines, known as spectral bands. Unresolved band spectra may appear as a spectral continuum.

== Emission spectroscopy ==
Light consists of electromagnetic radiation of different wavelengths. Therefore, when the elements or their compounds are heated either on a flame or by an electric arc they emit energy in the form of light. Analysis of this light, with the help of a spectroscope gives us a discontinuous spectrum. A spectroscope or a spectrometer is an instrument which is used for separating the components of light, which have different wavelengths. The spectrum appears in a series of lines called the line spectrum. This line spectrum is called an atomic spectrum when it originates from an atom in elemental form. Each element has a different atomic spectrum. The production of line spectra by the atoms of an element indicate that an atom can radiate only a certain amount of energy. This leads to the conclusion that bound electrons cannot have just any amount of energy but only a certain, specific amount of energy.

The emission spectrum can be used to determine the composition of a material, since it is different for each element of the periodic table. One example is astronomical spectroscopy: identifying the composition of stars by analysing the received light. The emission spectrum characteristics of some elements are plainly visible to the naked eye when these elements are heated. For example, when platinum wire is dipped into a sodium nitrate solution and then inserted into a flame, the sodium atoms emit an amber yellow color. Similarly, when indium is inserted into a flame, the flame becomes blue. These definite characteristics allow elements to be identified by their atomic emission spectrum. Not all emitted lights are perceptible to the naked eye, as the spectrum also includes ultraviolet rays and infrared radiation. An emission spectrum is formed when an excited gas is viewed directly through a spectroscope.

Schematic diagram of spontaneous emission

Emission spectroscopy is a spectroscopic technique which examines the wavelengths of photons emitted by atoms or molecules during their transition from an excited state to a lower energy state. Each element emits a characteristic set of discrete wavelengths according to its electronic structure, and by observing these wavelengths the elemental composition of the sample can be determined. Emission spectroscopy developed in the late 19th century and efforts in theoretical explanation of atomic emission spectra eventually led to quantum mechanics.

There are many ways in which atoms can be brought to an excited state. Interaction with electromagnetic radiation is used in fluorescence spectroscopy, protons or other heavier particles in particle-induced X-ray emission and electrons or X-ray photons in energy-dispersive X-ray spectroscopy or X-ray fluorescence. The simplest method is to heat the sample to a high temperature, after which the excitations are produced by collisions between the sample atoms. This method is used in flame emission spectroscopy, and it was also the method used by Anders Jonas Ångström when he discovered the phenomenon of discrete emission lines in the 1850s.

Although the emission lines are caused by a transition between quantized energy states and may at first look very sharp, they do have a finite width, i.e. they are composed of more than one wavelength of light. This spectral line broadening has many different causes.

Emission spectroscopy is often referred to as optical emission spectroscopy because of the light nature of what is being emitted.

== History ==
In 1756 Thomas Melvill observed the emission of distinct patterns of colour when salts were added to alcohol flames. By 1785 James Gregory discovered the principles of diffraction grating and David Rittenhouse made the first engineered diffraction grating. In 1821 Joseph von Fraunhofer solidified this significant experimental leap of replacing a prism as the source of wavelength dispersion improving the spectral resolution and allowing for the dispersed wavelengths to be quantified.

In 1835, Charles Wheatstone reported that different metals could be distinguished by bright lines in the emission spectra of their sparks, thereby introducing an alternative to flame spectroscopy. In 1849, J. B. L. Foucault experimentally demonstrated that absorption and emission lines at the same wavelength are both due to the same material, with the difference between the two originating from the temperature of the light source. In 1853, the physicist Anders Jonas Ångström presented observations and theories about gas spectra. Ångström postulated that an incandescent gas emits luminous rays of the same wavelength as those it can absorb. At the same time George Stokes and William Thomson (Kelvin) were discussing similar postulates. Ångström also measured the emission spectrum from hydrogen later labeled the Balmer lines. In 1854 and 1855, David Alter published observations on the spectra of metals and gases, including an independent observation of the Balmer lines of hydrogen.

By 1859, Gustav Kirchhoff and Robert Bunsen noticed that several Fraunhofer lines (lines in the solar spectrum) coincide with characteristic emission lines identified in the spectra of heated elements. It was correctly deduced that dark lines in the solar spectrum are caused by absorption by chemical elements in the solar atmosphere.

== Experimental technique in flame emission spectroscopy ==
The solution containing the relevant substance to be analysed is drawn into the burner and dispersed into the flame as a fine spray. The solvent evaporates first, leaving finely divided solid particles which move to the hottest region of the flame where gaseous atoms and ions are produced through the dissociation of molecules. Here electrons are excited as described above, and the spontaneously emit photon to decay to lower energy states. It is common for a monochromator to be used to allow for easy detection.

On a simple level, flame emission spectroscopy can be observed using just a flame and samples of metal salts. This method of qualitative analysis is called a flame test. For example, sodium salts placed in the flame will glow yellow from sodium ions, while strontium (used in road flares) ions color it red. Copper wire will create a green colored flame, however in the presence of chloride gives blue (molecular contribution by CuCl).

== Emission coefficient ==
Emission coefficient is a coefficient in the power output per unit time of an electromagnetic source, a calculated value in physics. The emission coefficient of a gas varies with the wavelength of the light. It has unit m⋅s^{−3}⋅sr^{−1}.

=== Scattering of light ===
In Thomson scattering a charged particle emits radiation under incident light. The particle may be an ordinary atomic electron, so emission coefficients have practical applications.

If X dV dΩ dλ is the energy scattered by a volume element dV into solid angle dΩ between wavelengths λ and λ + dλ per unit time then the emission coefficient is X.

The values of X in Thomson scattering can be predicted from incident flux, the density of the charged particles and their Thomson differential cross section (area/solid angle).

=== Spontaneous emission ===
A warm body emitting photons has a monochromatic emission coefficient relating to its temperature and total power radiation. This is sometimes called the second Einstein coefficient, and can be deduced from quantum mechanical theory.

== See also ==
- Absorption spectroscopy
- Absorption spectrum
- Atomic spectral line
- Electromagnetic spectroscopy
- Electromagnetic spectrum
- Gas-discharge lamp, Table of emission spectra of gas discharge lamps
- Isomeric shift
- Isotopic shift
- Luminous coefficient
- Plasma physics
- Rydberg formula
- Spectral theory
- The Diode equation includes the emission coefficient (which is not related to the one discussed here)
- Thermionic emission
