= PKS 2145+067 =

Quasar in the constellation of Pegasus

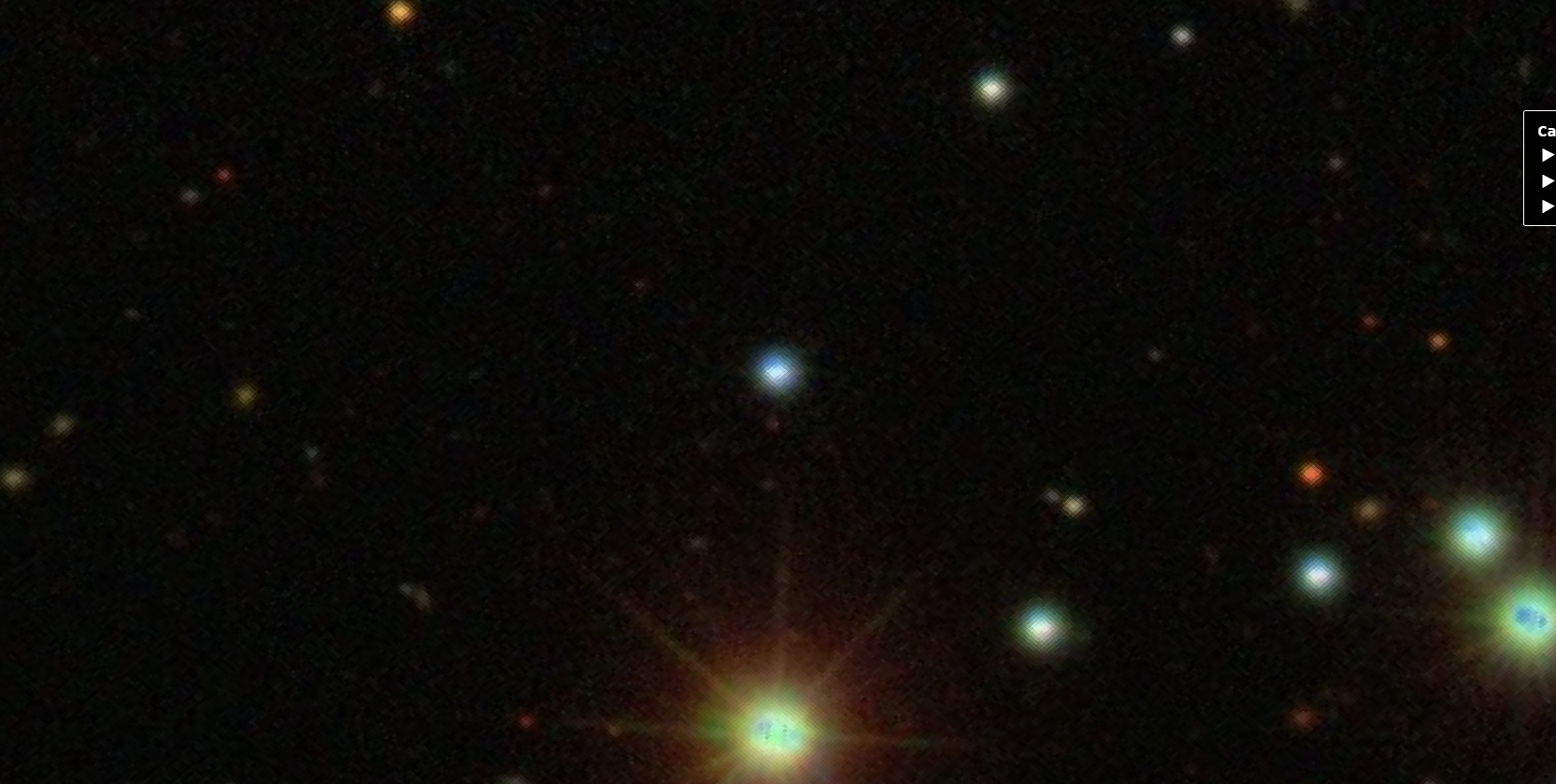
- SDSS image of PKS 2145+067

Observation data (J2000.0 epoch)
- Constellation: Pegasus
- Right ascension: 21^{h} 48^{m} 05.45^{s}
- Declination: +06° 57′ 38.60″
- Redshift: 1.003000
- Heliocentric radial velocity: 300,692 km/s
- Distance: 7.527 Gly
- Apparent magnitude (V): 16.47
- Apparent magnitude (B): 16.85

Characteristics
- Type: Opt.var.; LPQ FSRQ

Other designations
- 4C +06.69, PKS 2145+06, 2MASS J21480545+0657386, LEDA 2818722, PMN J2148+0657, NVSS J214805+065739, DA 562, OX +076.1, PAPER J327.74+07.03, WMAP 037, RX J2148.0+0657, JVAS J2148+0657

PKS 2145+067 is a radio-loud quasar located in the constellation of Pegasus. It has a redshift of (z) 1.003 and it was first discovered by astronomers conducting the Parkes Survey at Parkes Observatory in 1966, designated as PKS 2145+06. The radio spectrum of the object is flat, making it a flat-spectrum source, but it is classified as a weakly polarized quasar.

== Description ==
PKS 2145+067 is classified as a blazar mainly due to its variability on the electromagnetic spectrum, displaying four flares when observed at eight frequency bands between 4.8 and 230 GHz frequencies, and radio flux variations that reaching 2 Jy within 2 hours. In additional to its flaring activity, it also had weak intensity fluctuations resulting from interstellar scintillation in daily averages of 2695 and 8086 MHz. The X-ray flux of the quasar is known to vary, from 3.3 × 10^{−12} erg cm^{−2} s^{−1} at 0.1 and 2.0 KeV in May 1991 to 3.8 × 10^{−12} erg cm^{−2} s^{−1} in 1994.

The radio structure of PKS 2145+067 is compact. When observed with Very Long Baseline Interferometry (VLBI), the radio core is shown as weakly elongated with no signs of a significant structure. At 5 GHz, it has a strong elongated component towards the south-east direction and another component found diffused with a position angle of 140°. These two components are found embedded in a diffused halo. VLBI Observations at 93 centimeters showed the source has some possible structural features that are located 48 and 200 milliarcseconds from the core and a single component roughly containing 30% of its flux density. Geodetic VLBI imaging revealed the object's core has a size of 0.25 milliarcseconds in extent and a brightness temperature of 1.4 × 10^{12} Kelvin, with extended radio emission orientating at 140°.

The jet of PKS 2145+067 is known to be compact. When observed by Flávio Benevenuto da Silva Junior and Anderson Caproni, the jet was made up of 11 components which are moving at superluminal velocities with speeds between 10c and 18c. The position angles of these components are all estimated between the ranges of 0.03 and 11.29 degrees.

PKS 2145+067 is classified as a Lyman-limit quasar with a detected Lyman-limit system located at the redshift of (z) 0.7913, accompanying several metal-rich absorption lines in various states of low and high ionization. X-ray observations by the Advanced Satellite for Cosmology and Astrophysics (ASCA) also showed the quasar has a 0.6-10 KeV spectrum of 1.3 × 10^{−11} erg cm^{−2} s^{-1,} best fitted by a power-law model. The host galaxy of PKS 2145+067 is marginally resolved by near-infrared H-band imaging.
