= Radio Recombination Lines =

Emission lines detected in astrophysics

A radio recombination line (RRL) in astrophysics is a spectral emission line produced by the transition of electrons between two energy levels in an atom, and with a rest frequency in the radio band of the electromagnetic spectrum. This effect is produced in ionized gas, driven by the recombination of ions with electrons, when the energy of the electron falls enough to be captured by the ion. Following this capture, the electron cascades down through the energy levels to a stable state, emitting a photon at each transition. In low density regions of the interstellar medium (ISM), these atoms can remain stable up to very high quantum number (n~1000), and have a diameter up to 1 micron across, similar to the size of a human hair.

The Bohr model predicting the strength of emission lines at different quantum numbers allows for the existence of RRLs, but they were not studied until several decades later in 1945 by Dutch astronomer, Hendrik van de Hulst. In his work, van de Hulst proposed the existence of observable radio line emission from highly excited atoms in the ISM, as well as predicted the observable 21-cm emission of neutral hydrogen regions. For hydrogen, this effect occurs in H II regions and can be thought of as a rarer example of the hydrogen spectral series, only occurring for electron transitions beginning above $n>27$.

The first search for astronomical RRLs were begun in 1958 by T. M. Egorova and N. F. Ryzhkov, focusing on the H271α line in the galactic plane, resulting in no clear detection of the line. Six years after the first searches began, a group at Lebedev Physical Institute in Moscow detected the first RRLs using a 22-m radio telescope on 27 April 1964. The group detected the H90α transition, at a rest frequency of 8872.5 MHz and produced in the Omega Nebula. A separate Russian group detected the H104α line one month later in May 1964, again in the Omega nebula.

RRLs were first observed at cosmological distances (z = 1.124) in 2019, and are suggested to have originated from a warm hydrogen or cold neutral carbon region within a dwarf-like galaxy that is being energized by a background quasar.
