= Walther Ritz =

Swiss theoretical physicist

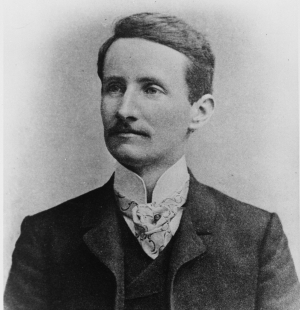
- Born: 22 February 1878; Sion, Switzerland
- Died: 7 July 1909 (aged 31); Göttingen
- Education: University of Göttingen
- Known for: Ritz method Ritz ballistic theory Ritz–Galerkin method Rayleigh–Ritz method Rydberg–Ritz combination principle
- Awards: Leconte Prize (1909)
- Scientific career
- Fields: Physics

Walther Heinrich Wilhelm Ritz (22 February 1878 – 7 July 1909) was a Swiss theoretical physicist. He is most famous for his work with Johannes Rydberg on the Rydberg–Ritz combination principle. Ritz is also known for the variational method named after him, the Ritz method.

== Life ==
Walter Ritz's father Raphael Ritz was born in Valais and was a well-known painter. His mother, born Nördlinger, was the daughter of an engineer from Tübingen. Ritz was a particularly gifted student and attended the municipal lyceum in Sion. In 1897, he entered the polytechnic school in Zürich, where he studied engineering. Soon, he found out that he could not live with the approximations and compromises associated with engineering, so he switched to the more mathematically accurate physical sciences.

In 1900, Ritz contracted tuberculosis, possibly also pleurisy, which he later died from. In 1901 he moved to Göttingen for health reasons. There he was influenced by Woldemar Voigt and David Hilbert. Ritz wrote a dissertation on spectral lines of atoms and received his doctorate with summa cum laude. The theme later led to the Ritz combination principle and in 1913 to the atomic model of Ernest Rutherford and Niels Bohr.

In the spring of 1903, he heard lectures by Hendrik Antoon Lorentz in Leiden on electrodynamic problems and his new electron theory. In June 1903 he was in Bonn at the Heinrich Kayser Institute, where he found in potash a spectral line that he had predicted in his dissertation. In November 1903, he was in Paris at the Ecole Normale Supérieure. There he worked on infrared photo plates.

In July 1904 his illness worsened and he moved back to Zürich. The disease prevented him from publishing further scientific publications until 1906. In September 1907 he moved to Tübingen, the place of origin of his mother, and in 1908 again to Göttingen, where he became a private lecturer at the university. There he published his work Recherches critiques sur l'Electrodynamique Générale, see below.

As a student, friend or colleague, Ritz had contacts with many contemporary scholars such as Hilbert, Andreas Heinrich Voigt, Hermann Minkowski, Lorentz, Aimé Cotton, Friedrich Paschen, Henri Poincaré and Albert Einstein. He was a fellow student of Einstein in Zürich, while he studied there. Ritz was an opponent of Einstein's theory of relativity.

Ritz died in Göttingen and was buried in the Nordheim cemetery in Zürich. The family tomb was lifted on 15 November 1999. His tombstone is in section 17 with the grave number 84457.

== Works ==
=== Criticism of Maxwell–Lorentz electromagnetic theory ===
Not so well known is the fact that in 1908 Ritz produced a lengthy criticism of Maxwell–Lorentz electromagnetic theory, in which he contended that the theory's connection with the luminescent ether (see Lorentz ether theory) made it "essentially inappropriate to express the comprehensive laws for the propagation of electrodynamic actions."

Ritz pointed out seven problems with Maxwell–Lorentz electromagnetic field equations:

- Electric and magnetic forces really express relations about space and time and should be replaced with non-instantaneous elementary actions.
- Advanced potentials don't exist (and their erroneous use led to the Rayleigh–Jeans ultraviolet catastrophe).
- Localization of energy in the ether is vague.
- It is impossible to reduce gravity to the same notions.
- The unacceptable inequality of action and reaction is brought about by the concept of absolute motion with respect to the ether.
- Apparent relativistic mass increase is amenable to different interpretations.
- The use of absolute coordinates, if independent of all motions of matter, requires throwing away the time-honoured use of Galilean relativity and our notions of rigid ponderable bodies.

Instead, he indicated that light is not propagated (in a medium) but is projected. This theory, however, is considered to be refuted.

=== Ritz's method ===
In 1909 Ritz developed a direct method to find an approximate solution for boundary value problems. It converts the often insoluble differential equation into the solution of a matrix equation. It is a theoretical preparatory work for the finite element method (FEM). This method is also known as Ritz's variation principle and the Rayleigh-Ritz principle.

=== Ritz's combination principle ===
In 1908, Ritz found empirically the Ritz combination principle named after him. After that, the sum or difference of the frequencies of two spectral lines is often the frequency of another line. Which of these calculated frequencies is actually observed was only explained later by selection rules, which follow from quantum mechanical calculations. The basis for this was the spectral line research (Balmer series) by Johann Jakob Balmer.

== Honours ==
- The lunar crater Ritz is named after him.
