= Isotopic shift =

Mass effects on spectroscopy

The isotopic shift (also called isotope shift) is the shift in various forms of spectroscopy that occurs when one nuclear isotope is replaced by another.

== NMR spectroscopy ==
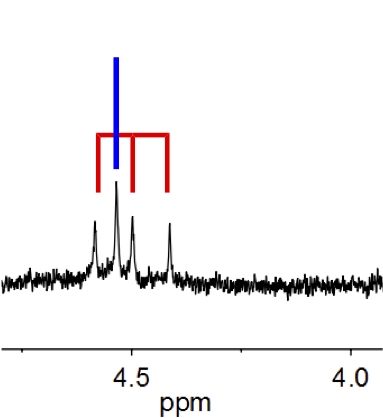
H NMR spectrum of a solution of HD (labeled with red bars) and H_{2} (blue bar). The 1:1:1 triplet arises from the coupling of the ^{1}H nucleus (I = 1/2) to the ^{2}H nucleus (I = 1).

In NMR spectroscopy, isotopic effects on chemical shifts are typically small, far less than 1 ppm, the typical unit for measuring shifts. The ^{1}H NMR signals for ^{1}H_{2} and ^{1}H^{2}H ("HD") are readily distinguished in terms of their chemical shifts. The asymmetry of the signal for the "protio" impurity in CD_{2}Cl_{2} arises from the differing chemical shifts of CDHCl_{2} and CH_{2}Cl_{2}.

== Vibrational spectra ==
Isotopic shifts are best known and most widely used in vibration spectroscopy, where the shifts are large, being proportional to the ratio of the square root of the isotopic masses. In the case of hydrogen, the "H-D shift" is (1/2)^{1/2} ≈ 1/1.41. Thus, the (totally symmetric) C−H and C−D vibrations for CH_{4} and CD_{4} occur at 2917 cm^{−1} and 2109 cm^{−1} respectively. This shift reflects the differing reduced mass for the affected bonds.

== Atomic spectra ==
Isotope shifts in atomic spectra are minute differences between the electronic energy levels of isotopes of the same element. They are the focus of a multitude of theoretical and experimental efforts due to their importance for atomic and nuclear physics. If atomic spectra also have hyperfine structure, the shift refers to the center of gravity of the spectra.

From a nuclear physics perspective, isotope shifts combine different precise atomic physics probes for studying nuclear structure, and their main use is nuclear-model-independent determination of charge-radii differences.

Two effects contribute to this shift:

=== Mass effects ===
The mass difference (mass shift), which dominates the isotope shift of light elements. It is traditionally divided into a normal mass shift (NMS) resulting from the change in the reduced electronic mass, and a specific mass shift (SMS), which is present in multi-electron atoms and ions.

The NMS is a purely kinematical effect, studied theoretically by Hughes and Eckart. It can be formulated as follows:

In a theoretical model of an atom, which has an infinitely massive nucleus, the energy (in wavenumbers) of a transition can be calculated from Rydberg formula:
$$\tilde{\nu}_\infty = R_\infty \left(\frac{1}{n^2} - \frac{1}{n'^2} \right),$$
where $n$ and $n'$ are principal quantum numbers, and $R_\infty$ is Rydberg constant.

However, for a nucleus with finite mass $M$, reduced mass is used in the expression of the Rydberg constant instead of the electron mass:
$$\tilde{\nu} = \tilde{\nu}_\infty \frac{M}{m_e + M}.$$

For two isotopes with atomic masses approximately $A' m_u$ and $A'' m_u$, where $m_u$ is the unified atomic mass unit, the difference in the energies of the same transition is
$$\Delta\tilde{\nu} =
\tilde{\nu}_\infty \left( \frac{1}{1 + \frac{m_e}{A'' m_u}} - \frac{1}{1 + \frac{m_e}{A' m_u}} \right) \approx
\tilde{\nu}_\infty \left[ 1 - \frac{m_e}{A'' m_u} - \left( 1 - \frac{m_e}{A' m_u} \right) \right] \approx
\frac{m_e}{m_u} \frac{A'' - A'}{A' A''} \tilde{\nu}_\infty.$$
The above equations imply that such mass shift is greatest for hydrogen and deuterium, since their mass ratio is the largest, $A'' = 2A'$.

The effect of the specific mass shift was first observed in the spectrum of neon isotopes by Nagaoka and Mishima.

Consider the kinetic energy operator in Schrödinger equation of multi-electron atoms:
$$T = \frac{p_n^2}{2M} + \sum_i \frac{p_i^2}{2m_e},$$
For a stationary atom, the conservation of momentum gives
$$p_n = -\sum_i p_i.$$
Therefore, the kinetic energy operator becomes
$$T =
\frac{\left( \sum_i p_i \right)^2}{2M} + \frac{\sum_i p_i^2}{2m_e} =
\frac{\sum_i p_i^2}{2M} + \frac{1}{M} \sum_{i > j} p_i \cdot p_j + \frac{\sum_i p_i^2}{2m_e}.$$

Ignoring the second term, the remaining two terms in the equation can be combined, and the original mass term needs to be replaced by the reduced mass $\mu = \frac{m_e M}{m_e + M}$, which gives the normal mass shift formulated above.

The second term in the kinetic term gives an additional isotope shift in spectral lines known as specific mass shift, giving
$$\frac{1}{M} \sum_{i > j} p_i \cdot p_j = -\frac{\hbar^2}{M} \sum_{i > j} \nabla_i \cdot \nabla_j.$$
Using perturbation theory, the first-order energy shift can be calculated as
$$\Delta E = -\frac{\hbar^2}{M} \sum_{i > j} \int \psi^* \nabla_i \cdot \nabla_j \psi \,d^3 r,$$
which requires the knowledge of an accurate many-electron wave function. Due to the $1/M$ term in the expression, the specific mass shift also decreases as $1/M^2$ as the mass of the nucleus increases, same as the normal mass shift.

=== Volume effects ===
The volume difference (field shift) dominates the isotope shift of heavy elements. This difference induces a change in the electric charge distribution of the nucleus. The phenomenon was described theoretically by Pauli and Peierls. Adopting a simplified picture, the change in an energy level resulting from the volume difference is proportional to the change in total electron probability density at the origin times the mean-square charge radius difference.

For a simple nuclear model of an atom, the nuclear charge is distributed uniformly in a sphere with radius $R = r_0 A^{1/3}$, where A is the atomic mass number, and $r_0 \approx 1.2 \times 10^{-15}\ \text{m}$ is a constant.

Similarly, calculating the electrostatic potential of an ideal charge density uniformly distributed in a sphere, the nuclear electrostatic potential is
$$V(r) = \begin{cases}
\dfrac{Ze^2}{(4\pi\epsilon_0)2R} \left( \dfrac{r^2}{R^2} - 3 \right), & r \leq R, \\
-\dfrac{Ze^2}{(4\pi\epsilon_0)r}, & r \geq R.
\end{cases}$$
When the unperturbed Hamiltonian is subtracted, the perturbation is the difference of the potential in the above equation and Coulomb potential $-\frac{Ze^2}{(4\pi\epsilon_0)r}$:
$$H' = \begin{cases}
\dfrac{Ze^2}{(4\pi\epsilon_0)2R} \left( \dfrac{r^2}{R^2} + \dfrac{2R}{r} - 3 \right), & r \leq R, \\
0, & r \geq R.
\end{cases}$$

Such a perturbation of the atomic system neglects all other potential effect, like relativistic corrections. Using the perturbation theory (quantum mechanics), the first-order energy shift due to such perturbation is
$$\Delta E = \langle \psi_{nlm} | H' | \psi_{nlm} \rangle.$$
The wave function $\psi_{nlm} = R_{nl}(r)Y_{lm}(\theta, \phi)$ has radial and angular parts, but the perturbation has no angular dependence, so the spherical harmonic normalize integral over the unit sphere:
$$\Delta E = \frac{Ze^2}{(4\pi\epsilon_0)2R} \int_0^R |R_{nl}(r)|^2 \left( \frac{r^2}{R^2} + \frac{2R}{r} - 3 \right) r^2 \,dr.$$
Since the radius of nuclues $R$ is small, and within such a small region $r \leq R$, the approximation $R_{nl}(r) \approx R_{nl}(0)$ is valid. And at $r \approx 0$, only the s sublevel remains, so $l = 0$. Integration gives
$$\Delta E \approx
\frac{Ze^2}{(4\pi\epsilon_0)} \frac{R^2}{10} |R_{n0}(0)|^2 =
\frac{Ze^2}{(4\pi\epsilon_{0})} \frac{2\pi}{5} R^2 |\psi_{n00}(0)|^2.$$

The explicit form for hydrogenic wave function, $|\psi_{n00}(0)|^2 = \frac{Z^3}{\pi a_\mu^3 n^3}$, gives
$$\Delta E \approx \frac{e^2}{(4\pi\epsilon_0)} \frac{2}{5} R^2 \frac{Z^4}{a_\mu^3 n^3}.$$

In a real experiment, the difference of this energy shift of different isotopes $\delta E$ is measured. These isotopes have nuclear radius difference $\delta R$. Differentiation of the above equation gives the first order in $\delta R$:
$$\delta E \approx \frac{e^2}{(4\pi\epsilon_0)} \frac{4}{5} R^2 \frac{Z^4}{a_\mu^3 n^3} \frac{\delta R}{R}.$$
This equation confirms that the volume effect is more significant for hydrogenic atoms with larger Z, which explains why volume effects dominates the isotope shift of heavy elements.

== See also ==
- Kinetic isotope effect
- Magnetic isotope effect
