= Ritz ballistic theory =

Ritz ballistic theory is an emission theory in physics, first published in 1908 by Swiss physicist Walther Ritz. In 1908, Ritz published Recherches critiques sur l'Électrodynamique générale, a lengthy criticism of Maxwell-Lorentz electromagnetic theory, in which he contended that the theory's connection with the luminiferous aether (see Lorentz ether theory) made it "essentially inappropriate to express the comprehensive laws for the propagation of electrodynamic actions." He argued that, among its difficulties, is that there are too many solutions. Problems admit both advanced and retarded solutions, but advanced solutions are unphysical, since they allow the future to influence the past.

Ritz also rejected special relativity. He proposed to preserve classical mechanics, and modify the equations of electromagnetism instead. He argued that the advanced solution is unacceptable, but cannot be excluded based on the mere Maxwell equations. Therefore, he proposed to add another assumption, that only the retarded solution is physically allowed. He proposed a new equation, derived from the principles of the ballistic theory of electromagnetic waves, a theory competing with the special theory of relativity. The equation relates the force between two charged particles with a radial separation r relative velocity v and relative acceleration a, where k is an undetermined parameter from the general form of Ampere's force law as proposed by Maxwell. The equation obeys Newton's third law and forms the basis of Ritz's electrodynamics.

$$\mathbf{F} = \frac{q_1 q_2} {4\pi \epsilon_0 r^2} \left[\left[1+\frac{3-k}{4} \left(\frac{v}{c}\right)^2 - \frac{3(1-k)}{4} \left(\frac{\mathbf{v\cdot r}}{r c}\right)^2 - \frac{1}{2c^2} (\mathbf{a\cdot r}) \right] \frac{\mathbf{r}}{r} - \frac{k+1}{2rc^2} (\mathbf{v\cdot r})\mathbf{v} - \frac{r}{c^2} (\mathbf{a})\right]$$

== Derivation of Ritz's equation ==
On the assumption of an emission theory, the force acting between two moving charges should depend on the density of the messenger particles emitted by the charges ($D$), the radial distance between the charges (ρ), the velocity of the emission relative to the receiver, ($U_x$ and $U_r$ for the x and r components, respectively), and the acceleration of the particles relative to each other ($a_x$). This gives us an equation of the form:

$$F_x =  eD \left[ A_1 \cos(\rho x)+ B_1 \frac{U_x U_r} {c^2} + C_1 \frac{\rho a_x} {c^2} \right]$$.

where the coefficients $A_1$, $B_1$ and $C_1$ are independent of the coordinate system and are functions of $u^2/c^2$ and $u^2_\rho /c^2$. The stationary coordinates of the observer relate to the moving frame of the charge as follows

$$X+x(t') = X'+x'(t')-(t-t')v'_x$$

Developing the terms in the force equation, we find that the density of particles is given by

$$D \alpha  \frac {dt' e' dS} {\rho^2} = - \frac {e' \partial \rho} {c \rho^2 \partial n} dS dn$$

The tangent plane of the shell of emitted particles in the stationary coordinate is given by the Jacobian of the transformation from $X'$ to $X$:

$$\frac{\partial \rho} {\partial n} = \frac{\partial (XYZ)} {\partial (X'Y'Z')} = \frac{a e'}{\rho^2} \left(1 +\frac{\rho a'_\rho}{c^2} \right)$$

We can also develop expressions for the retarded radius $\rho$ and velocity $U_\rho <\rho>$ using Taylor series expansions

$$\rho = r \left(1+\frac{ra'_r}{c^2}\right)^{1/2}$$
$$\rho_x = r_x + \frac{r^2 a'_x}{2c^2}$$
$$U_\rho = v_r - v'_r +\frac{ra'_r}{c}$$

With these substitutions, we find that the force equation is now

$$F_x = \frac{ee'}{r^2} \left(1+\frac{ra'_r}{c^2}\right) \left[A \cos(rx) \left(1-\frac{3ra'_r}{2c^2}\right) + A\left(\frac{ra'_x}{2c^2}\right)-B\left(\frac{u_x u_r}{c^2}\right)-C\left(\frac{ra'_x}{c^2}\right)\right]$$

Next we develop the series representations of the coefficients

$$A = \alpha_0 + \alpha_1 \frac{u^2} {c^2} + \alpha_2 \frac{u^2_r}{c^2}+...$$
$$B = \beta_0 + \beta_1 \frac{u^2} {c^2} + \beta_2 \frac{u^2_r}{c^2}+...$$
$$C = \gamma_0 + \gamma_1 \frac{u^2} {c^2} + \gamma_2 \frac{u^2_r}{c^2}+...$$

With these substitutions, the force equation becomes

$$F_x = \frac{ee'}{r^2} \left[\left(\alpha_0+\alpha_1 \frac{u_x^2}{c^2}+\alpha_2 \frac{u^2_r}{c^2}\right) \cos(rx) - \beta_0 \frac{u_x u_r}{c^2}-\alpha_0 \frac{ra'_r}{2c^2} + \left(\frac{ra'_x}{2c^2}\right)(\alpha_0-2\gamma_0) \right]$$

Since the equation must reduce to the Coulomb force law when the relative velocities are zero, we immediately know that $\alpha_0 = 1$. Furthermore, to obtain the correct expression for electromagnetic mass, we may deduce that $2\gamma_0 -1 = 1$ or $\gamma_0 =1$.

To determine the other coefficients, we consider the force on a linear circuit using Ritz's expression, and compare the terms with the general form of Ampere's law. The second derivative of Ritz's equation is

$$d^2 F_x = \sum_{i,j}\frac{de_i de_j'}{r^2} \left[\left(1+\alpha_1 \frac{u_x^2}{c^2}+\alpha_2 \frac{u_r^2}{c^2}\right) \cos(rx) - \beta_0 \frac{u_x u_r}{c^2}-\alpha_0 \frac{ra'_r}{2c^2} + \frac{ra'_x}{2c^2}\right]$$

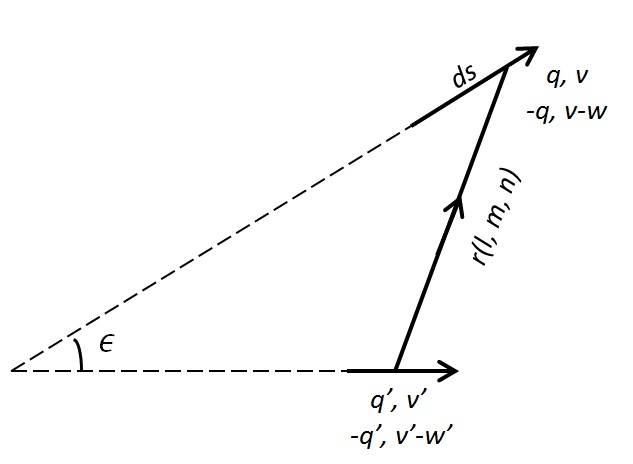
Diagram of elements of linear circuits

Consider the diagram on the right, and note that $dq v = I dl$,

$$\sum_{i,j} de_i de_j' = 0$$

$\sum_{i,j} de_i de_j' u^2_x = -2dq dq' w_x w'_x$

$$= -2 I I' ds ds' \cos\epsilon$$

$\sum_{i,j} de_i de_j' u^2_r = -2dq dq' w_r w'_r$

$$= -2 I I' ds ds' \cos(rds)\cos(rds)$$

$\sum_{i,j} de_i de_j' u_x u_r = -dq dq' (w_x w'_r+w'_x w_r)$

$$= -I I' ds ds' \left[\cos(xds)\cos(rds)+\cos(rds)\cos(xds')\right]$$

$$\sum_{i,j} de_i de_j' a'_r = 0$$

$$\sum_{i,j} de_i de_j' a'_x = 0$$

Plugging these expressions into Ritz's equation, we obtain the following

$$d^2 F_x = \frac{I I' ds ds'}{r^2} \left[\left[2\alpha_1 \cos\epsilon + 2\alpha_2 \cos(rds) \cos(rds')\right]\cos(rx) - \beta_0 \cos(rds')\cos(xds)-\beta_0 \cos(rds)\cos(xds')\right]$$

Comparing to the original expression for Ampere's force law

$$d^2 F_x = - \frac{I I' ds ds'}{2r^2} \left[\left[(3-k)\cos\epsilon - 3(1-k) \cos(rds) \cos(rds')\right]\cos(rx)-(1+k)\cos(rds')\cos(xds)-(1+k)\cos(rds)\cos(xds')\right]$$

we obtain the coefficients in Ritz's equation

$$\alpha_1 = \frac{3-k}{4}$$
$$\alpha_2 = -\frac{3(1-k)}{4}$$
$$\beta_0 = \frac{1+k}{2}$$

From this we obtain the full expression of Ritz's electrodynamic equation with one unknown

$$\mathbf{F} = \frac{q_1 q_2} {4\pi \epsilon_0 r^2} \left[\left[1+\frac{3-k}{4} \left(\frac{v}{c}\right)^2 - \frac{3(1-k)}{4} \left(\frac{\mathbf{v\cdot r}}{c^2}\right)^2 - \frac{r}{2c^2} (\mathbf{a\cdot r}) \right] \frac{\mathbf{r}}{r} - \frac{k+1}{2c^2} (\mathbf{v\cdot r})\mathbf{v} - \frac{r}{c^2} (\mathbf{a})\right]$$

In a footnote at the end of Ritz's section on Gravitation ( English translation) the editor says, "Ritz used k = 6.4 to reconcile his formula (to calculate the angle of advancement of perihelion of planets per century) with the observed anomaly for Mercury (41") however recent data give 43.1", which leads to k = 7. Substituting this result into Ritz's formula yields exactly the general relativity formula." Using this same integer value for k in Ritz's electrodynamic equation we get:

$$\mathbf{F} = \frac{q_1 q_2} {4\pi \epsilon_0 r^2} \left[\left[1 - \left(\frac{v}{c}\right)^2 + 4.5 \left(\frac{\mathbf{v\cdot r}}{c^2}\right)^2 - \frac{r}{2c^2} (\mathbf{a\cdot r}) \right] \frac{\mathbf{r}}{r} - \frac{4}{c^2} (\mathbf{v\cdot r})\mathbf{v} - \frac{r}{c^2} (\mathbf{a})\right]$$
