= Wavenumber =

Spatial frequency of a wave

Diagram illustrating the relationship between the wavenumber and the other properties of harmonic waves

In the physical sciences, the wavenumber (or wave number), also known as repetency, is the spatial frequency of a wave. Ordinary wavenumber is defined as the number of wave cycles divided by length; it is a physical quantity with dimension of reciprocal length, expressed in SI units of cycles per metre or reciprocal metre (m^{−1}).

Angular wavenumber, typically denoted by the letter $k$, defined as the wave phase divided by length, is a quantity with dimension of angle per length (or simply reciprocal length) and SI units of radians per metre (or m^{−1}). They are analogous to temporal frequency, respectively the ordinary frequency, defined as the number of wave cycles divided by time (in cycles per second or reciprocal seconds), and the angular frequency, defined as the phase angle divided by time (in radians per second).

In multidimensional systems, the angular wavenumber $k$ is the magnitude of the wave vector. The space of wave vectors is called reciprocal space. Wave numbers and wave vectors play an essential role in optics and the physics of wave scattering, such as X-ray diffraction, neutron diffraction, electron diffraction, and elementary particle physics. For quantum mechanical waves, the wavenumber multiplied by the reduced Planck constant is the canonical momentum.

Wavenumber can be used to specify quantities other than spatial frequency. For example, in optical spectroscopy, it is often used as a unit of temporal frequency assuming a certain speed of light.

== Definition ==
Wavenumber, as used in spectroscopy and most chemistry fields, is defined as the number of wavelengths per unit distance:
$$\tilde{\nu} \;=\; \frac{1}{\lambda},$$
where λ is the wavelength. It is sometimes called the "spectroscopic wavenumber". It equals the spatial frequency.

In theoretical physics, an angular wave number, defined as the number of radians per unit distance is more often used:
$$k \;=\; \frac{2\pi}{\lambda} = 2\pi\tilde{\nu}.$$

=== Units ===
The SI unit of spectroscopic wavenumber is the reciprocal m, written m^{−1}. However, it is more common, especially in spectroscopy, to give wavenumbers in cgs units i.e., reciprocal centimeters or cm^{−1}, with
$$1~\mathrm{cm}^{-1} = 100~\mathrm{m}^{-1}.$$

Occasionally in older references, the unit kayser (after Heinrich Kayser) is used; it is abbreviated as K or Ky, where 1 K = 1 cm^{−1}.

Angular wavenumber may be expressed in the unit radian per meter (rad⋅m^{−1}), or as above, since the radian is dimensionless.

==== Unit conversions ====
The frequency of light with wavenumber $\tilde{\nu}$ is
$$f = \frac{c}{\lambda} = c \tilde{\nu},$$
where $c$ is the speed of light. The conversion from spectroscopic wavenumber to frequency is therefore
$$1~\mathrm{cm}^{-1} \cdot c =29.9792458~\mathrm{GHz}.$$

Wavenumber can also be used as unit of energy, since a photon of frequency $f$ has energy $hf$, where $h$ is the Planck constant. The energy of a photon with wavenumber $\tilde{\nu}$ is
$$E = hf = hc \tilde{\nu}.$$
The conversion from spectroscopic wavenumber to energy is therefore
$$1~\mathrm{cm}^{-1} \cdot hc
= 1.986446 \times 10^{-23}~\mathrm{J}
= 1.239842 \times 10^{-4}~\mathrm{eV}$$
where energy is expressed either in J or eV.

=== Complex ===
A complex-valued wavenumber can be defined for a medium with complex-valued relative permittivity $\varepsilon_r$, relative permeability $\mu_r$ and refraction index n as:
$$k = k_0 \sqrt{\varepsilon_r\mu_r} = k_0 n$$
where k_{0} is the free-space wavenumber, as above. The imaginary part of the wavenumber expresses attenuation per unit distance and is useful in the study of exponentially decaying evanescent fields.

=== Plane waves in linear media ===
The propagation factor of a sinusoidal plane wave propagating in the positive x direction in a linear material is given by
$$P = e^{-jkx}$$
where

- $k = k' - jk'' = \sqrt{-\left(\omega \mu '' + j \omega \mu' \right) \left(\sigma + \omega \varepsilon '' + j \omega \varepsilon ' \right) }\;$
- $k' =$ phase constant in the units of radians/meter
- $k'' =$ attenuation constant in the units of nepers/meter
- $\omega =$ angular frequency
- $x =$ distance traveled in the x direction
- $\sigma =$ conductivity in Siemens/meter
- $\varepsilon = \varepsilon' - j\varepsilon'' =$ complex permittivity
- $\mu = \mu' - j\mu'' =$ complex permeability
- $j=\sqrt{-1}$

The sign convention is chosen for consistency with propagation in lossy media. If the attenuation constant is positive, then the wave amplitude decreases as the wave propagates in the x-direction.

Wavelength, phase velocity, and skin depth have simple relationships to the components of the wavenumber:
$$\lambda = \frac {2 \pi} {k'} \qquad  v_p = \frac {\omega} {k'}   \qquad  \delta = \frac 1 {k''}$$

== In wave equations ==
Here we assume that the wave is regular in the sense that the different quantities describing the wave such as the wavelength, frequency and thus the wavenumber are constants. See wavepacket for discussion of the case when these quantities are not constant.

In general, the angular wavenumber k (i.e. the magnitude of the wave vector) is given by
$$k = \frac{2\pi}{\lambda} = \frac{2\pi\nu}{v_\mathrm{p}}=\frac{\omega}{v_\mathrm{p}}$$
where ν is the frequency of the wave, λ is the wavelength, ω = 2πν is the angular frequency of the wave, and v_{p} is the phase velocity of the wave. The dependence of the wavenumber on the frequency (or more commonly the frequency on the wavenumber) is known as a dispersion relation.

For the special case of an electromagnetic wave in a vacuum, in which the wave propagates at the speed of light, k is given by
$$k = \frac{E}{\hbar c} = \frac{\omega}{c}$$
where E is the energy of the wave, ħ is the reduced Planck constant, and c is the speed of light in a vacuum.

For the special case of a matter wave, for example an electron wave, in the non-relativistic approximation (in the case of a free particle, that is, the particle has no potential energy):
$$k \equiv \frac{2\pi}{\lambda} = \frac{p}{\hbar}= \frac{\sqrt{2 m E }}{\hbar}$$
Here p is the momentum of the particle, m is the mass of the particle, E is the kinetic energy of the particle, and ħ is the reduced Planck constant.

Wavenumber is also used to define the group velocity.

== In spectroscopy ==
In spectroscopy, "wavenumber" $\tilde{\nu}$ (in reciprocal centimeters, cm^{−1}) refers to a temporal frequency (in hertz) divided by the speed of light in vacuum (usually in centimeters per second, cm⋅s^{−1}):
$$\tilde{\nu} = \frac{\nu}{c} = \frac{\omega}{2\pi c}.$$
The historical reason for using this spectroscopic wavenumber rather than frequency is that it is a convenient unit when studying atomic spectra by counting fringes per cm with an interferometer : the spectroscopic wavenumber is the reciprocal of the wavelength of light in vacuum:
$$\tilde \nu = \frac{1}{\lambda_{\rm vac}},$$
which remains essentially the same in air, and so the spectroscopic wavenumber is directly related to the angles of light scattered from diffraction gratings and the distance between fringes in interferometers, when those instruments are operated in air or vacuum. Such wavenumbers were first used in the calculations of Johannes Rydberg in the 1880s. The Rydberg–Ritz combination principle of 1908 was also formulated in terms of wavenumbers. A few years later spectral lines could be understood in quantum theory as differences between energy levels, energy being proportional to wavenumber, or frequency. However, spectroscopic data kept being tabulated in terms of spectroscopic wavenumber rather than frequency or energy.

For example, the spectroscopic wavenumbers of the emission spectrum of atomic hydrogen are given by the Rydberg formula:
$$\tilde{\nu} = R\left(\frac{1}{{n_\text{f}}^2} - \frac{1}{{n_\text{i}}^2}\right),$$
where R is the Rydberg constant, and n_{i} and n_{f} are the principal quantum numbers of the initial and final levels respectively (n_{i} is greater than n_{f} for emission).

A spectroscopic wavenumber can be converted into energy per photon E by Planck's relation:
$$E = hc\tilde{\nu}.$$
It can also be converted into wavelength of light:
$$\lambda = \frac{1}{n \tilde \nu},$$
where n is the refractive index of the medium. Note that the wavelength of light changes as it passes through different media, however, the spectroscopic wavenumber (i.e., frequency) remains constant.

Often spatial frequencies are stated by some authors "in wavenumbers", incorrectly transferring the name of the quantity to the CGS unit cm^{−1} itself.

== See also ==
- Angular wavelength
- Spatial frequency
- Refractive index
- Zonal wavenumber
