= Ritz (crater) =

Crater on the Moon

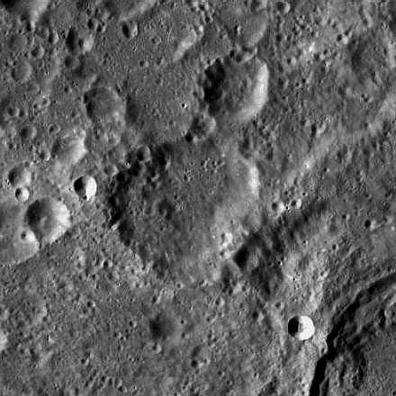
- LRO image
- Coordinates: 15.1°S 92.2°E
- Diameter: 51 km
- Depth: 3,75 km
- Colongitude: 268° at sunrise
- Eponym: Walther Ritz

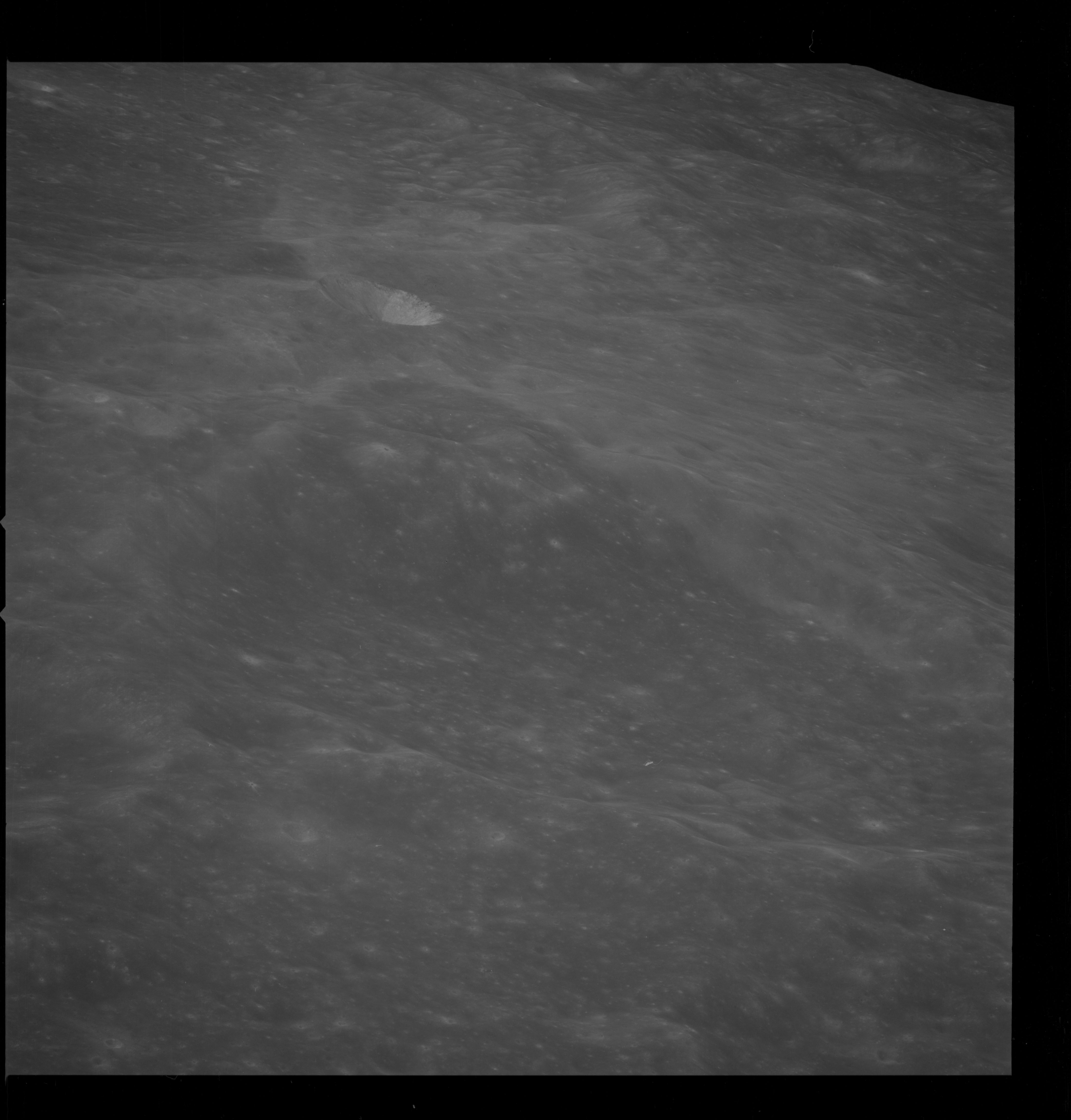
Oblique view from Apollo 8

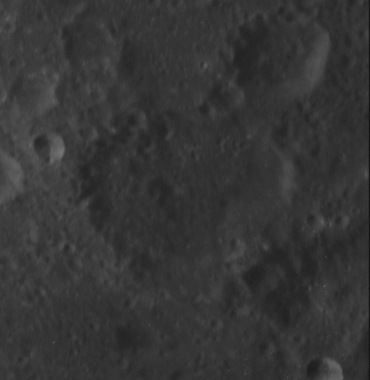
View from Apollo 14

Ritz is a lunar impact crater that is located on the far side of the Moon, just beyond the eastern limb. This portion of the lunar surface is sometimes brought into view of the Earth under favorable conditions of libration and sunlight. The crater lies to the northwest of the prominent crater Sklodowska.

This is a heavily worn and eroded crater formation that has not retained much of its original structure. The outer rim is an irregular circular ridge that surrounds the interior floor. There are a pair of small craterlets in the western part of the interior. The satellite crater Ritz B is nearly attached to the northeastern outer rim.

== Satellite craters ==
By convention these features are identified on lunar maps by placing the letter on the side of the crater midpoint that is closest to Ritz.

Ritz	Latitude	Longitude	Diameter
B	13.7° S	92.8° E	26 km
J	16.0° S	92.9° E	11 km
