= Lyman–Werner photons =

Category of ultraviolet photons

A Lyman-Werner photon is an ultraviolet photon with a photon energy in the range of 11.2 to 13.6 eV, corresponding to the energy range in which the Lyman and Werner absorption bands of molecular hydrogen (H_{2}) are found. A photon in this energy range, with a frequency that coincides with that of one of the lines in the Lyman or Werner bands, can be absorbed by H_{2}, placing the molecule in an excited electronic state. Radiative decay (that is, decay into photons) from this excited state occurs rapidly, with roughly 15% of these decays occurring into the vibrational continuum of the molecule, resulting in its dissociation. This two-step photodissociation process, known as the Solomon process, is one of the main mechanisms by which molecular hydrogen is destroyed in the interstellar medium.

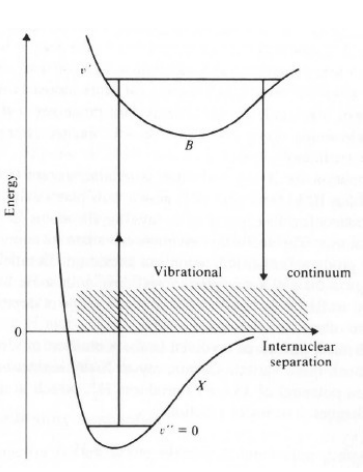
Electronic and vibrational levels of the hydrogen molecule

In reference to the figure shown, Lyman-Werner photons are emitted as described below:

- A hydrogen molecule can absorb a far-ultraviolet photon (11.2 eV < energy of the photon < 13.6 eV) and make a transition from the ground electronic state X to excited state B (Lyman) or C (Werner).
- Radiative decay occurs rapidly.
- 10–15% of the decays occur into the vibrational continuum. This means that the hydrogen molecule has dissociated.
- Photo-dissociation fragments carry away some of the photon energy as kinetic energy, heating the gas.
- Rest of the decays are either radiative decay (infrared emission) or collisional, which ultimately end up heating the gas.

== See also ==
- Lyman limit
