= Zonal wavenumber =

Quantity associated with atmospheric waves

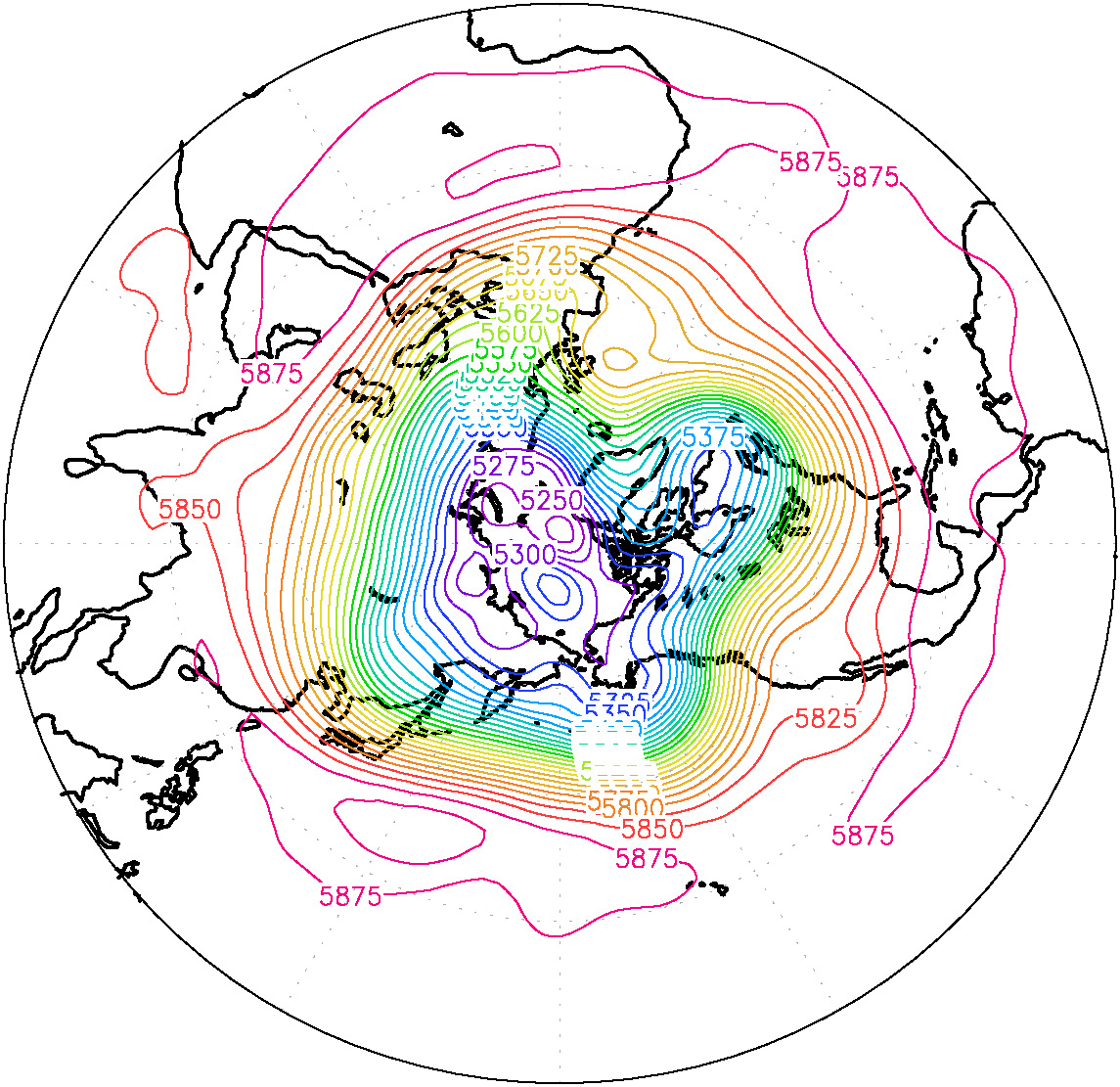
500mb geopotential height averaged between October 9–21, 2010 illustrating Rossby wave pattern with the zonal wavenumber 4. DOE AMIP reanalysis data.

In meteorological applications, a zonal wavenumber or hemispheric wavenumber is the dimensionless number of wavelengths fitting within a full circle around the globe at a given latitude:

$$k = \frac{2\pi r\cos\varphi} \lambda,$$

where λ is the wavelength, r = 6378 km is the Earth's radius, and $\varphi$ is the latitude.

Zonal wavenumbers are typically counted on the upper level (say 500-millibar) geopotential maps by identifying troughs and ridges of the waves. Wavenumber 1 has one trough and one ridge, i.e. one wavelength fits 2π = 360°. Wavenumber 2 has two ridges and two troughs around 360°.

Wavenumber 0 corresponds to zonal (symmetric) flow. Wavenumbers 1–3 are called long waves and are often synonymous in meteorological literature with the mid-latitude planetary Rossby waves, while wavenumbers 4–10 are often referred to as "synoptic" waves. In the Northern Hemisphere, wavenumbers 1 and 2 are important for the time-mean circulation due to topography (Tibetan Plateau and Rocky Mountains), whereas in the Southern Hemisphere, tropical convection is responsible for the presence of mainly zonal wavenumber 3.

== See also ==
- Wavenumber
