= Balmer jump =

Difference of intensity of the stellar continuum spectrum

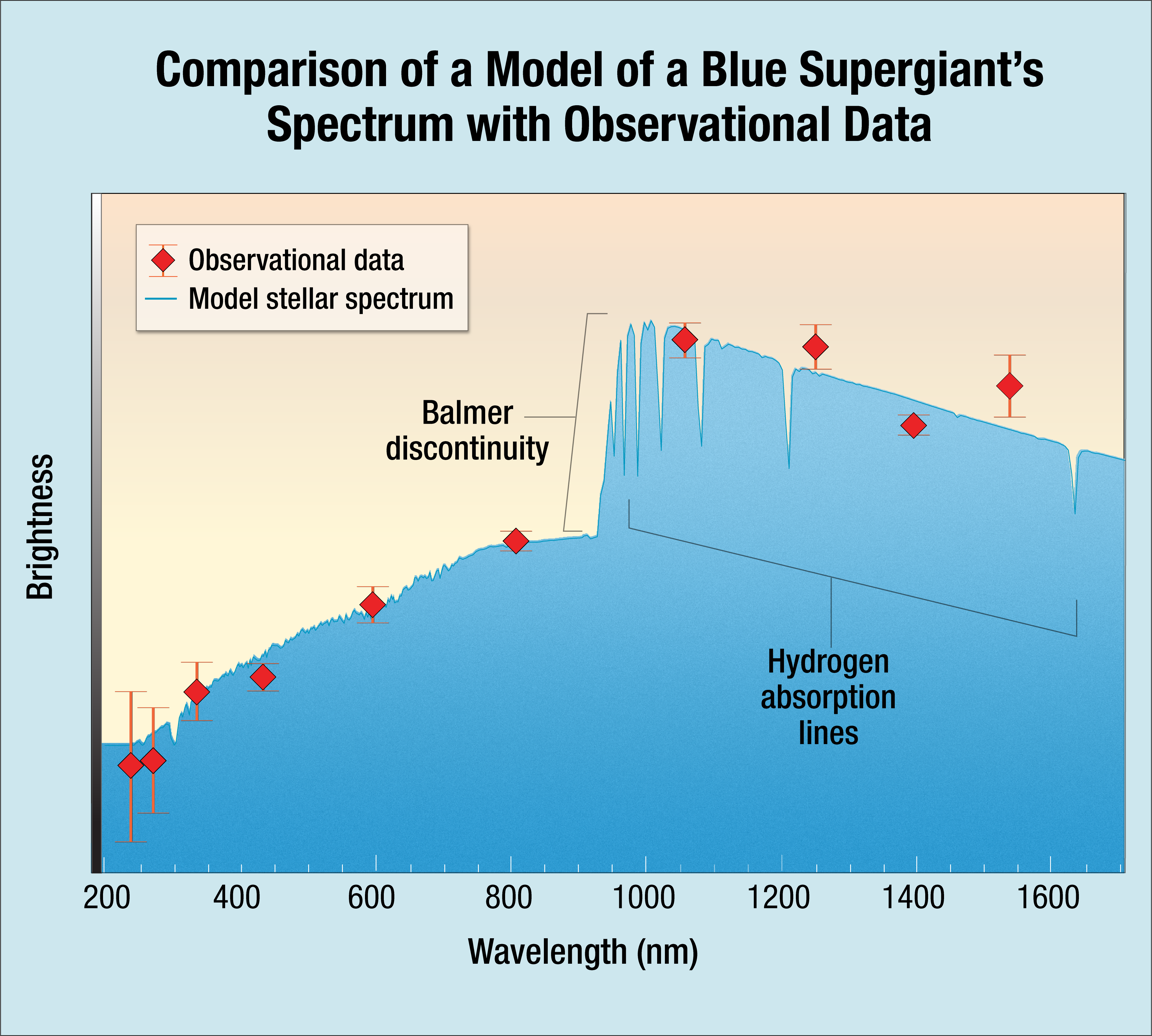
Balmer discontinuity on the observational spectrum of the star Icarus. The jump in this plot appears around 920 nm (instead of the intrinsic 364.5 nm) due to cosmological redshift.

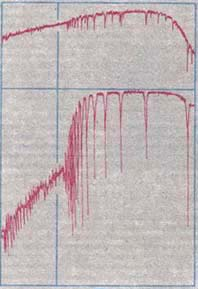
Balmer jump of two stars: Epsilon Orionis (O9.7 V) on the top and Beta Tauri (B7 III) on the bottom. The vertical blue line represents the limit of the Balmer series.

The Balmer jump, Balmer discontinuity, or Balmer break is the difference of intensity of the stellar spectrum on either side of the limit of the Balmer series of hydrogen, at approximately 364.5 nm. It is caused by electrons being completely ionized directly from the second energy level of a hydrogen atom (bound-free absorption). Since a freed electron can take on any kinetic energy level, compared to a bound electron whose energy levels are discrete, this creates a continuum absorption at wavelengths shorter than 364.5 nm.

In some cases the Balmer discontinuity can show continuum emission, usually when the Balmer lines themselves are strongly in emission. Other hydrogen spectral series also show bound-free absorption and hence a continuum discontinuity, but the Balmer jump in the near UV has been the most observed.

The strength of the continuum absorption, and hence the size of the Balmer jump, depends on temperature and density in the region responsible for the absorption. At cooler stellar temperatures, the density most strongly affects the strength of the discontinuity and this can be used to classify stars on the basis of their surface gravity and hence luminosity. This effect is strongest in A class stars, but in hotter stars temperature has a much larger effect on the Balmer jump than surface gravity.

== See also ==
- Lyman-break galaxy – Star-forming galaxies at high redshift
