= Hydrogen spectral series =

Important atomic emission spectra

The spectral series of hydrogen, on a logarithmic scale.

The emission spectrum of atomic hydrogen has been divided into a number of spectral series, with wavelengths given by the Rydberg formula. These observed spectral lines are due to the electron making transitions between two energy levels in an atom. The classification of the series by the Rydberg formula was important in the development of quantum mechanics. The spectral series are important in astronomical spectroscopy for detecting the presence of hydrogen and calculating red shifts.

== Physics ==
Electron transitions and their resulting wavelengths for hydrogen. Energy levels are not to scale.

A hydrogen atom consists of a nucleus and an electron orbiting around it. The electromagnetic force between the electron and the nuclear proton leads to a set of quantum states for the electron, each with its own energy. These states were visualized by the Bohr model of the hydrogen atom as being distinct orbits around the nucleus. Each energy level, or electron shell, or orbit, is designated by an integer, n as shown in the figure. The Bohr model was later replaced by quantum mechanics in which the electron occupies an atomic orbital rather than an orbit, but the allowed energy levels of the hydrogen atom remained the same as in the earlier theory.

Spectral emission occurs when an electron transitions, or jumps, from a higher energy state to a lower energy state. To distinguish the two states, the lower energy state is commonly designated as n′, and the higher energy state is designated as n. The energy of an emitted photon corresponds to the energy difference between the two states. Because the energy of each state is fixed, the energy difference between them is fixed, and the transition will always produce a photon with the same energy.

The spectral lines are grouped into series according to n′. Lines are named sequentially starting from the longest wavelength/lowest frequency of the series, using Greek letters within each series. For example, the 2 → 1 line is called "Lyman-alpha" (Ly-α), while the 7 → 3 line is called "Paschen-delta" (Pa-δ).

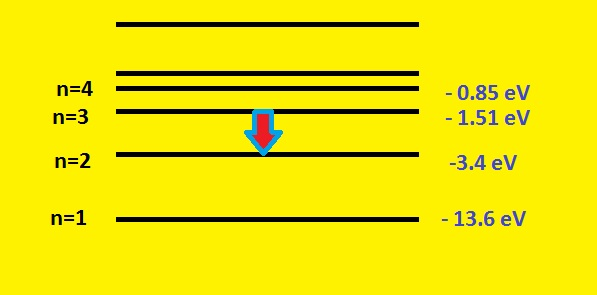
Energy level diagram of electrons in hydrogen atom

There are emission lines from hydrogen that fall outside of these series, such as the 21 cm line. These emission lines correspond to much rarer atomic events such as hyperfine transitions. The fine structure also results in single spectral lines appearing as two or more closely grouped thinner lines, due to relativistic corrections.

In quantum mechanical theory, the discrete spectrum of atomic emission was based on the Schrödinger equation, which is mainly devoted to the study of energy spectra of hydrogen-like atoms, whereas the time-dependent equivalent Heisenberg equation is convenient when studying an atom driven by an external electromagnetic wave.

In the processes of absorption or emission of photons by an atom, the conservation laws hold for the whole isolated system, such as an atom plus a photon. Therefore the motion of the electron in the process of photon absorption or emission is always accompanied by motion of the nucleus, and, because the mass of the nucleus is always finite, the energy spectra of hydrogen-like atoms must depend on the nuclear mass.

== Rydberg formula ==
The energy differences between levels in the Bohr model, and hence the wavelengths of emitted or absorbed photons, is given by the Rydberg formula:
$$\frac{1}{\lambda} = Z^2 R_\infty \left( \frac{1}{{n'}^2} - \frac{1}{n^2} \right)$$

where

- Z is the atomic number,
- n′ (often written $n_1$) is the principal quantum number of the lower energy level,
- n (or $n_2$) is the principal quantum number of the upper energy level, and
- $R_\infty$ is the Rydberg constant. (1.09677×10^{7} m^{−1} for hydrogen and 1.09737×10^{7} m^{−1} for heavy metals).

The wavelength will always be positive because n′ is defined as the lower level and so is less than n. This equation is valid for all hydrogen-like species, i.e. atoms having only a single electron, and the particular case of hydrogen spectral lines is given by Z = 1.

== Series ==
=== Lyman series (n′ = 1) ===
Lyman series of hydrogen atom spectral lines in the ultraviolet

In the Bohr model, the Lyman series includes the lines emitted by transitions of the electron from an outer orbit of quantum number n > 1 to the 1st orbit of quantum number n' = 1.

The series is named after its discoverer, Theodore Lyman, who discovered the spectral lines from 1906–1914. All the wavelengths in the Lyman series are in the ultraviolet band.

n	λ, vacuum (nm)
2	121.57
3	102.57
4	97.254
5	94.974
6	93.780
∞	91.175

=== Balmer series (n′ = 2) ===
The four visible hydrogen emission spectrum lines in the Balmer series. H-alpha is the red line at the right.

The Balmer series includes the lines due to transitions from an outer orbit n > 2 to the orbit n' = 2.

Named after Johann Balmer, who discovered the Balmer formula, an empirical equation to predict the Balmer series, in 1885. Balmer lines are historically referred to as "H-alpha", "H-beta", "H-gamma" and so on, where H is the element hydrogen. Four of the Balmer lines are in the technically "visible" part of the spectrum, with wavelengths between 400 nm and 700 nm. Parts of the Balmer series can be seen in the solar spectrum. H-alpha is an important line used in astronomy to detect the presence of hydrogen.

n	λ, air (nm)
3	656.3
4	486.1
5	434.0
6	410.2
7	397.0
∞	364.6

=== Paschen series (Bohr series, n′ = 3) ===
Named after the German physicist Friedrich Paschen who first observed them in 1908. The Paschen lines all lie in the infrared band. This series overlaps with the next (Brackett) series, i.e. the shortest line in the Brackett series has a wavelength that falls among the Paschen series. All subsequent series overlap.

n	λ, air (nm)
4	1875
5	1282
6	1094
7	1005
8	954.6
∞	820.4

=== Brackett series (n′ = 4) ===
Named after the American physicist Frederick Sumner Brackett who first observed the spectral lines in 1922. The spectral lines of Brackett series lie in far infrared band.

n	λ, air (nm)
5	4051
6	2625
7	2166
8	1944
9	1817
∞	1458

=== Pfund series (n′ = 5) ===
Experimentally discovered in 1924 by August Herman Pfund.

n	λ, vacuum (nm)
6	7460
7	4654
8	3741
9	3297
10	3039
∞	2279

=== Humphreys series (n′ = 6) ===
Discovered in 1953 by American physicist Curtis J. Humphreys.

n	λ, vacuum (μm)
7	12.37
8	7.503
9	5.908
10	5.129
11	4.673
∞	3.282

=== Further series (n′ > 6) ===
Further series are unnamed, but follow the same pattern and equation as dictated by the Rydberg equation. Series are increasingly spread out and occur at increasing wavelengths. The lines are also increasingly faint, corresponding to increasingly rare atomic events. The seventh series of atomic hydrogen was first demonstrated experimentally at infrared wavelengths in 1972 by Peter Hansen and John Strong at the University of Massachusetts Amherst.

=== Summary of series ===
The following table shows the wavelengths $\lambda$ in nanometers of the emitted photons as the electron transitions from $n$ to $n'$. Note that the wavelengths are for photons in air for the Balmer, Paschen, and Brackett series, while they are for photons in vacuum for the Lyman, Pfund, and Humphreys series.

n' n	1 (Lyman series)	2 (Balmer series)	3 (Paschen series)	4 (Brackett series)	5 (Pfund series)	6 (Humphreys series)
2	121.57					
3	102.57	656.3				
4	97.254	486.1	1875			
5	94.974	434.0	1282	4051		
6	93.780	410.2	1094	2625	7460	
7		397.0	1005	2166	4654	12.37×10^{3}
8			954.6	1944	3741	7.503×10^{3}
9				1817	3297	5.908×10^{3}
10					3039	5.129×10^{3}
11						4.673×10^{3}
$\infty$	91.175	364.6	820.4	1458	2279	3.282×10^{3}

== Extension to other systems ==
The concepts of the Rydberg formula can be applied to any system with a single particle orbiting a nucleus, for example a He^{+} ion or a muonium exotic atom. The equation must be modified based on the system's Bohr radius; emissions will be of a similar character but at a different range of energies. The Pickering–Fowler series was originally attributed to an unknown form of hydrogen with half-integer transition levels by both Pickering and Fowler, but Bohr correctly recognised them as spectral lines arising from the He^{+} ion.

All other atoms have at least two electrons in their neutral form and the interactions between these electrons makes analysis of the spectrum by such simple methods as described here impractical. The deduction of the Rydberg formula was a major step in physics, but it was long before an extension to the spectra of other elements could be accomplished.

== See also ==
- Astronomical spectroscopy
- The hydrogen line (21 cm)
- Lamb shift
- Moseley's law
- Quantum optics
- Radio recombination line
