= Balmer series =

Hydrogen spectral series

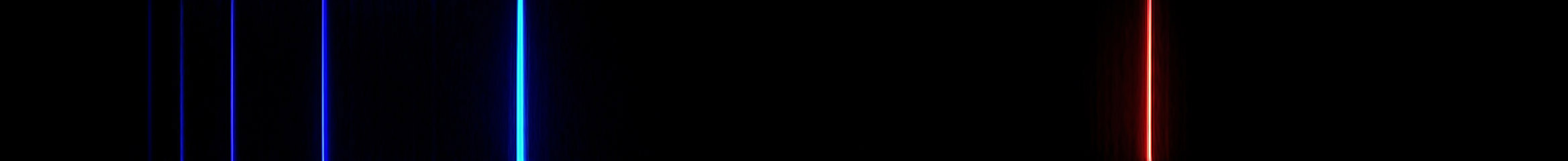
The "visible" hydrogen emission spectrum lines in the Balmer series. H-alpha is the red line at the right. Four lines (counting from the right) are formally in the visible range. Lines five and six can be seen with the naked eye, but are considered to be ultraviolet as they have wavelengths less than 400 nm.

The Balmer series, or Balmer lines in atomic physics, is one of a set of six named series describing the spectral line emissions of the hydrogen atom. The Balmer series is calculated using the Balmer formula, an empirical equation discovered by Johann Balmer in 1885.

The visible spectrum of light from hydrogen displays four wavelengths, 410 nm, 434 nm, 486 nm, and 656 nm, that correspond to emissions of photons by electrons in excited states transitioning to the quantum level described by the principal quantum number n equals 2. There are several prominent ultraviolet Balmer lines with wavelengths shorter than 400 nm. The series continues with an infinite number of lines whose wavelengths asymptotically approach the limit of 364.5 nm in the ultraviolet.

After Balmer's discovery, five other hydrogen spectral series were discovered, corresponding to electrons transitioning to values of n other than two.

== Overview ==
In the simplified Rutherford Bohr model of the hydrogen atom, the Balmer lines result from an electron jump between the second energy level closest to the nucleus, and those levels more distant. Shown here is a photon emission. The 3→2 transition depicted here produces H-alpha, the first line of the Balmer series. For hydrogen (Z = 1) this transition results in a photon of wavelength 656 nm (red).

The Balmer series is characterized by the electron transitioning from n ≥ 3 to n = 2, where n refers to the radial quantum number or principal quantum number of the electron. The transitions are named sequentially by Greek letter: n = 3 to n = 2 is called H-α, 4 to 2 is H-β, 5 to 2 is H-γ, and 6 to 2 is H-δ. As the first spectral lines associated with this series are located in the visible part of the electromagnetic spectrum, these lines are historically referred to as "H-alpha", "H-beta", "H-gamma", and so on, where H is the element hydrogen.

Transition of n	3→2	4→2	5→2	6→2	7→2	8→2	9→2	∞→2
Name	H-α / Ba-α	H-β / Ba-β	H-γ / Ba-γ	H-δ / Ba-δ	H-ε / Ba-ε	H-ζ / Ba-ζ	H-η / Ba-η	Balmer break
Wavelength (nm, air)	656.279	486.135	434.0472	410.1734	397.0075	388.9064	383.5397	364.5
Energy difference (eV)	1.89	2.55	2.86	3.03	3.13	3.19	3.23	3.40
Color	Red	Cyan	Blue	Violet	(Ultraviolet)	(Ultraviolet)	(Ultraviolet)	(Ultraviolet)

Although physicists were aware of atomic emissions before 1885, they lacked a tool to accurately predict where the spectral lines should appear. The Balmer equation predicts the four visible spectral lines of hydrogen with high accuracy. Balmer's equation inspired the Rydberg equation as a generalization of it, and this in turn led physicists to find the Lyman, Paschen, and Brackett series, which predicted other spectral lines of hydrogen found outside the visible spectrum.

The red H-alpha spectral line of the Balmer series of atomic hydrogen, which is the transition from the shell n = 3 to the shell n = 2, is one of the conspicuous colours of the universe. It contributes a bright red line to the spectra of emission or ionisation nebula, like the Orion Nebula, which are often H II regions found in star forming regions. In true-colour pictures, these nebula have a reddish-pink colour from the combination of visible Balmer lines that hydrogen emits.

Later, it was discovered that when the Balmer series lines of the hydrogen spectrum were examined at very high resolution, they were closely spaced doublets. This splitting is called fine structure. It was also found that excited electrons from shells with n greater than 6 could jump to the n = 2 shell, emitting shades of ultraviolet when doing so.

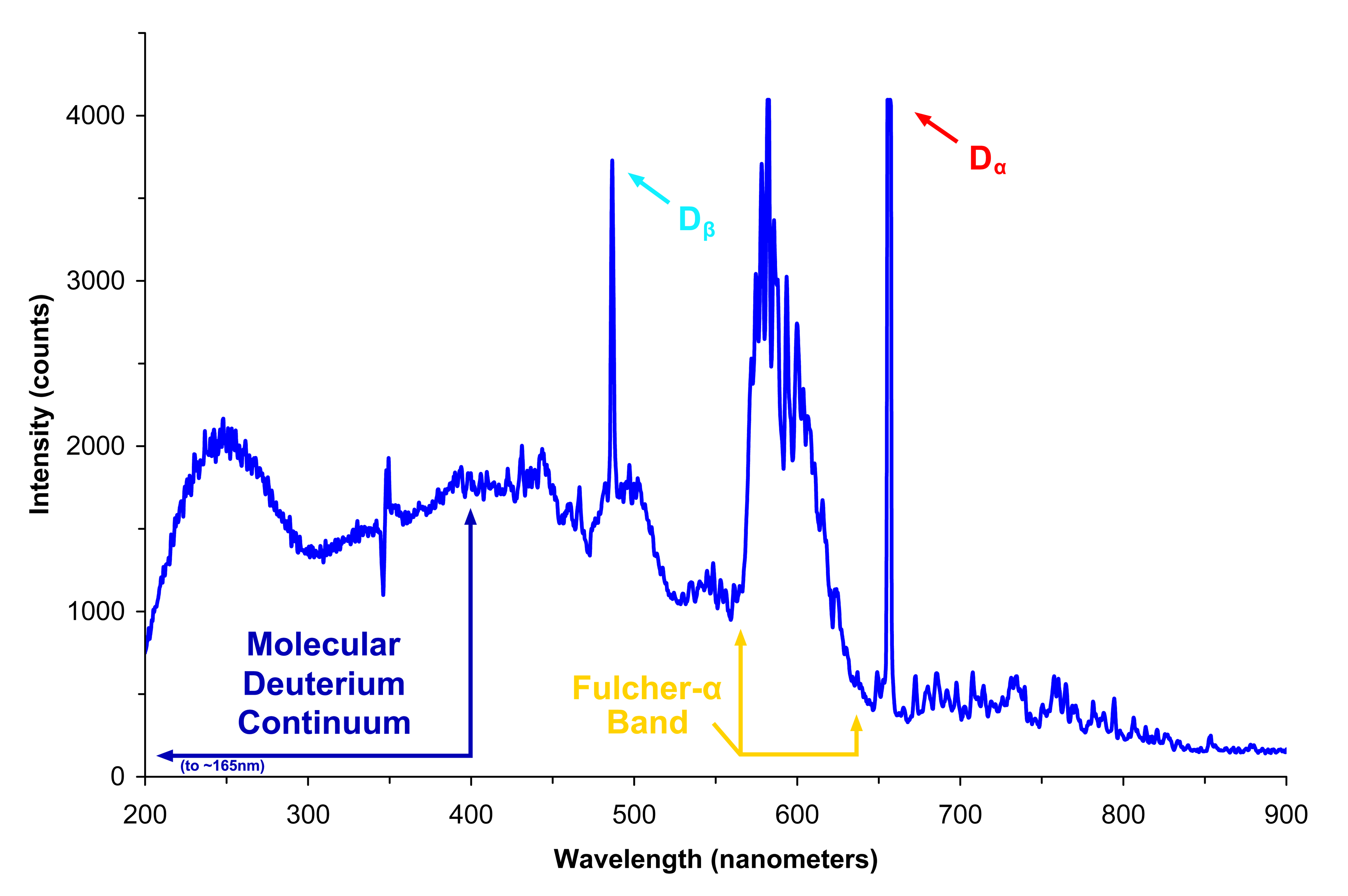
Two of the Balmer lines (α and β) are clearly visible in this emission spectrum of a deuterium lamp

== Balmer's formula ==
Balmer noticed that a single wavelength had a relation to every line in the hydrogen spectrum that was in the visible light region. That wavelength was 364.50682 nm. When any integer higher than 2 was squared and then divided by itself squared minus 4, then that number multiplied by 364.50682 nm (see equation below) gave the wavelength of another line in the hydrogen spectrum. By this formula, he was able to show that some measurements of lines made in his time by spectroscopy were slightly inaccurate, and his formula also predicted lines that had not yet been observed but were found later. His number also proved to be the limit of the sequence. The Balmer equation could be used to find the wavelength of the absorption/emission lines and was originally presented as follows (save for a notation change to give Balmer's constant as B):
$$\lambda\ = B\left(\frac{m^2}{m^2 - n^2}\right) = B\left(\frac{m^2}{m^2 - 2^2}\right)$$
where

- λ is the wavelength.
- B is a constant with the value of 3.6450682×10^{−7} m or 364.50682 nm.
- m is the initial state $(m \isin \mathbb{N}, m > n)$.
- n is the final state $(n \isin \mathbb{N}, n \ge 1)$ generally, and $(n = 2)$ for the Balmer series.

In 1888 the physicist Johannes Rydberg generalized the Balmer equation for all transitions of hydrogen. The equation commonly used to calculate the Balmer series is a specific example of the Rydberg formula and follows as a simple reciprocal mathematical rearrangement of the formula above (conventionally using a notation of m for n as the single integral constant needed):

$$\frac{1}{\lambda} = \frac{4}{B}\left(\frac{1}{2^2} - \frac{1}{n^2}\right) = R_\mathrm{H}\left(\frac{1}{2^2} - \frac{1}{n^2}\right) \quad \mathrm{for~} n=3,4,5,\dots$$

where λ is the wavelength of the absorbed/emitted light and R_{H} is the Rydberg constant for hydrogen. The Rydberg constant is seen to be equal to 4/B in Balmer's formula, and this value, for an infinitely heavy nucleus, is 4/(3.6450682×10^{−7} m) = 10973731.57 m^{−1}.

== Role in astronomy ==
The Balmer series is particularly useful in astronomy because the Balmer lines appear in numerous stellar objects due to the abundance of hydrogen in the universe, and therefore are commonly seen and relatively strong compared to lines from other elements. The first two Balmer lines correspond to the Fraunhofer lines C and F.

The spectral classification of stars, which is primarily a determination of surface temperature, is based on the relative strength of spectral lines, and the Balmer series in particular is very important. Other characteristics of a star that can be determined by close analysis of its spectrum include surface gravity (related to physical size) and composition.

Because the Balmer lines are commonly seen in the spectra of various objects, they are often used to determine radial velocities due to doppler shifting of the Balmer lines. This has important uses all over astronomy, from detecting binary stars, exoplanets, compact objects such as neutron stars and black holes (by the motion of hydrogen in accretion disks around them), identifying groups of objects with similar motions and presumably origins (moving groups, star clusters, galaxy clusters, and debris from collisions), determining distances (actually redshifts) of galaxies or quasars, and identifying unfamiliar objects by analysis of their spectrum.

Balmer lines can appear as absorption or emission lines in a spectrum, depending on the nature of the object observed. In stars, the Balmer lines are usually seen in absorption, and they are "strongest" in stars with a surface temperature of about 10,000 kelvins (spectral type A). In the spectra of most spiral and irregular galaxies, active galactic nuclei, H II regions and planetary nebulae, the Balmer lines are emission lines.

In stellar spectra, the H-epsilon line (transition 7→2, 397.007 nm) is often mixed in with another absorption line caused by ionized calcium known as "H" (the original designation given by Joseph von Fraunhofer). H-epsilon is separated by 0.16 nm from Ca II H at 396.847 nm, and cannot be resolved in low-resolution spectra. The H-zeta line (transition 8→2) is similarly mixed in with a neutral helium line seen in hot stars.

== See also ==
- Astronomical spectroscopy
- Bohr model
- Hydrogen spectral series
- Lyman series
- Rydberg formula
- Balmer jump
- Stellar classification
