= Rydberg constant =

Physical constants of energy and wavenumber

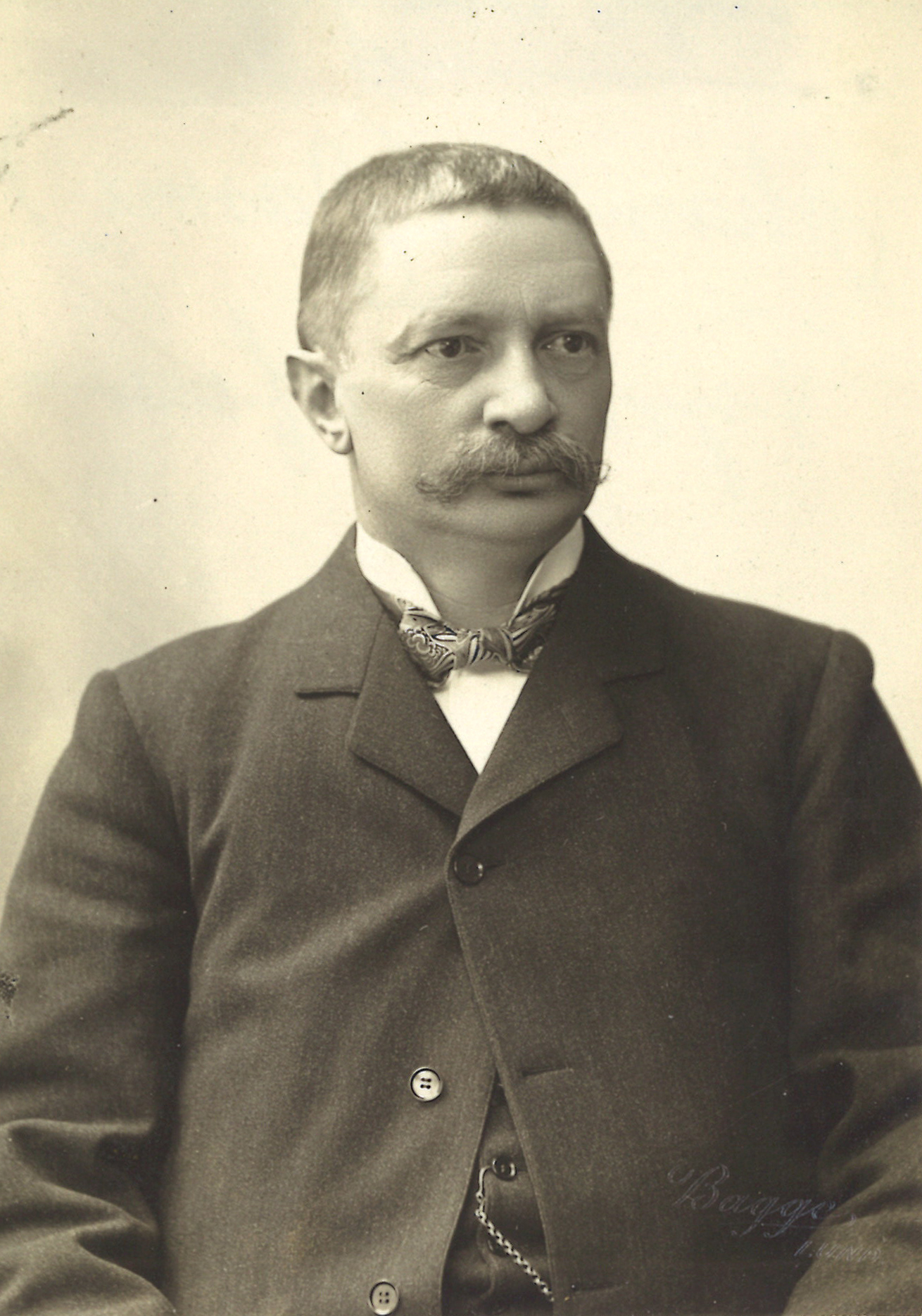
Johannes Rydberg (1854-1919), Swedish physicist and professor at Lund University.

In spectroscopy, the Rydberg constant, symbol $R_\infty$ for heavy atoms or $R_\text{H}$ for hydrogen, named after the Swedish physicist Johannes Rydberg, is a physical constant relating to the electromagnetic spectra of an atom. The constant first arose as an empirical fitting parameter in the Rydberg formula for the hydrogen spectral series, but Niels Bohr later showed that its value could be calculated from more fundamental constants according to his model of the atom.

Before the 2019 revision of the SI, $R_\infty$ and the electron spin g-factor were the most accurately measured physical constants.

The constant is expressed for either hydrogen as $R_\text{H}$, or at the limit of infinite nuclear mass as $R_\infty$. In either case, the constant is used to express the limiting value of the highest wavenumber (inverse wavelength) of any photon that can be emitted from a hydrogen atom, or, alternatively, the wavenumber of the lowest-energy photon capable of ionizing a hydrogen atom from its ground state. The hydrogen spectral series can be expressed simply in terms of the Rydberg constant for hydrogen $R_\text{H}$ and the Rydberg formula.

In atomic physics, Rydberg unit of energy, symbol Ry, corresponds to the energy of the photon whose wavenumber is the Rydberg constant, i.e. the ionization energy of the hydrogen atom in a simplified Bohr model.

== Value ==
=== Rydberg constant ===
The CODATA value is

$R_\infty = \frac{m_\text{e} e^4}{8 \varepsilon_{0}^{2} h^3 c} =$ 10973731.568157(12) m^{−1},

where

- $m_\text{e}$ is the rest mass of the electron (i.e. the electron mass),
- $e$ is the elementary charge,
- $\varepsilon_0$ is the permittivity of free space,
- $h$ is the Planck constant, and
- $c$ is the speed of light in vacuum.

The symbol $\infty$ means that the nucleus is assumed to be infinitely heavy; an improvement of the value can be made using the reduced mass of the atom:

$$\mu = \frac{ 1 }{ \frac{1}{m_\text{e}} + \frac{1}{M} }$$

with $M$ the mass of the nucleus. The corrected Rydberg constant is:

$$R_\text{M} = \frac{ \mu }{ m_\text{e} }R_\infty$$

that for hydrogen, where $M$ is the mass $m_\text{p}$ of the proton, becomes:

$$R_\text{H} = \frac{ m_\text{p} }{ m_\text{e}+m_\text{p} }R_\infty  \approx 1.09678 \times 10^7 \text{ m}^{-1} ,$$

Since the Rydberg constant is related to the spectrum lines of the atom, this correction leads to an isotopic shift between different isotopes. For example, deuterium, an isotope of hydrogen with a nucleus formed by a proton and a neutron ($M = m_\text{p} + m_\text{n}\approx 2m_\text{p}$), was discovered thanks to its slightly shifted spectrum.

=== Rydberg unit of energy ===
The Rydberg unit of energy is

$1 \ \text{Ry} ~~ \equiv h c\, R_\infty = \alpha^2 m_\text{e} c^2 /2$

= 2.1798723611030(24)×10^{−18} J
= 13.605693122990(15) eV

=== Rydberg frequency ===
$c R_\infty$ = 3.2898419602500(36)×10^{15} Hz.

=== Rydberg wavelength ===
$$\frac 1 {R_\infty} = 9.112\;670\;505\;826(10) \times 10^{-8}\ \text{m}$$.

The corresponding angular wavelength is

$$\frac 1 {2\pi R_\infty} = 1.450\;326\;555\;77(16) \times 10^{-8}\ \text{m}$$.

== Bohr model ==
The Bohr model explains the atomic spectrum of hydrogen (see Hydrogen spectral series) as well as various other atoms and ions. It is not perfectly accurate, but is a remarkably good approximation in many cases, and historically played an important role in the development of quantum mechanics. The Bohr model posits that electrons revolve around the atomic nucleus in a manner analogous to planets revolving around the Sun.

In the simplest version of the Bohr model, the mass of the atomic nucleus is considered to be infinite compared to the mass of the electron, so that the center of mass of the system, the barycenter, lies at the center of the nucleus. This infinite mass approximation is what is alluded to with the $\infty$ subscript. The Bohr model then predicts that the wavelengths of hydrogen atomic transitions are (see Rydberg formula):

$$\frac{1}{\lambda} = \mathrm{Ry} \cdot {1\over hc} \left(\frac{1}{n_1^2}-\frac{1}{n_2^2}\right)=\frac{m_\text{e} e^4}{8 \varepsilon_0^2 h^3 c} \left(\frac{1}{n_1^2}-\frac{1}{n_2^2}\right)$$

where n_{1} and n_{2} are any two different positive integers (1, 2, 3, ...), and $\lambda$ is the wavelength (in vacuum) of the emitted or absorbed light, giving

$$\frac{1}{\lambda} =  R_M\left(\frac{1}{n_1^2}-\frac{1}{n_2^2}\right)$$

where $R_M = \frac{R_\infty}{1+\frac{m_{\text{e}}}{M}},$ and M is the total mass of the nucleus. This formula comes from substituting the reduced mass of the electron.

== Precision measurement ==
The Rydberg constant was one of the most precisely determined physical constants, with a relative standard uncertainty of 1.1×10^{−12}. This precision constrains the values of the other physical constants that define it.

Since the Bohr model is not perfectly accurate, due to fine structure, hyperfine splitting, and other such effects, the Rydberg constant $R_{\infty}$ cannot be directly measured at very high accuracy from the atomic transition frequencies of hydrogen alone. Instead, the Rydberg constant is inferred from measurements of atomic transition frequencies in three different atoms (hydrogen, deuterium, and antiprotonic helium). Detailed theoretical calculations in the framework of quantum electrodynamics are used to account for the effects of finite nuclear mass, fine structure, hyperfine splitting, and so on. Finally, the value of $R_{\infty}$ is determined from the best fit of the measurements to the theory.

== Alternative expressions ==
The Rydberg constant can also be expressed as in the following equations.

$$R_\infty = \frac{\alpha^2 m_\text{e} c}{2h} = \frac{\alpha^2}{2 \lambda_{\text{e}}} = \frac{\alpha}{4\pi a_0}$$

and in energy units

$$\text{Ry} = h c R_\infty = \frac{1}{2} m_{\text{e}} c^2 \alpha^2 = \frac{1}{2} \frac{e^4 m_{\text{e}}}{(4 \pi \varepsilon_0)^2 \hbar^2} = \frac{1}{2} \frac{m_{\text{e}} c^2 r_{\text{e}}}{a_0} = \frac{1}{2} \frac{h c \alpha^2}{\lambda_{\text{e}}} = \frac{1}{2} h f_{\text{C}} \alpha^2 = \frac{1}{2} \hbar \omega_{\text{C}} \alpha^2 = \frac{1}{2 m_{\text{e}}}\left(\dfrac{\hbar}{a_0}\right)^2 = \frac{1}{2}\frac{e^2}{(4\pi\varepsilon_0)a_0} ,$$

where

- $m_\text{e}$ is the electron rest mass,
- $e$ is the electric charge of the electron,
- $h$ is the Planck constant,
- $\hbar= h/2\pi$ is the reduced Planck constant,
- $c$ is the speed of light in vacuum,
- $\varepsilon_0$ is the electric constant (vacuum permittivity),
- $\alpha = \frac{1}{4\pi\varepsilon_0}\frac{e^2}{\hbar c}$ is the fine-structure constant,
- $\lambda_{\text{e}} = h/m_\text{e} c$ is the Compton wavelength of the electron,
- $f_{\text{C}}=m_{\text{e}} c^2/h$ is the Compton frequency of the electron,
- $\omega_{\text{C}}=2\pi f_{\text{C}}$ is the Compton angular frequency of the electron,
- $a_0={4\pi\varepsilon_0\hbar^2}/{e^2m_{\text{e}}}$ is the Bohr radius,
- $r_\mathrm{e} = \frac{1}{4\pi\varepsilon_0}\frac{e^2}{m_{\mathrm{e}} c^2}$ is the classical electron radius.

The last expression in the first equation shows that the wavelength of light needed to ionize a hydrogen atom is 4π/α times the Bohr radius of the atom.

The second equation is relevant because its value is the coefficient for the energy of the atomic orbitals of a hydrogen atom: $E_n = -h c R_\infty / n^2$.

== See also ==
- Lyman limit
- Hartree
