= Bohr model of the chemical bond =

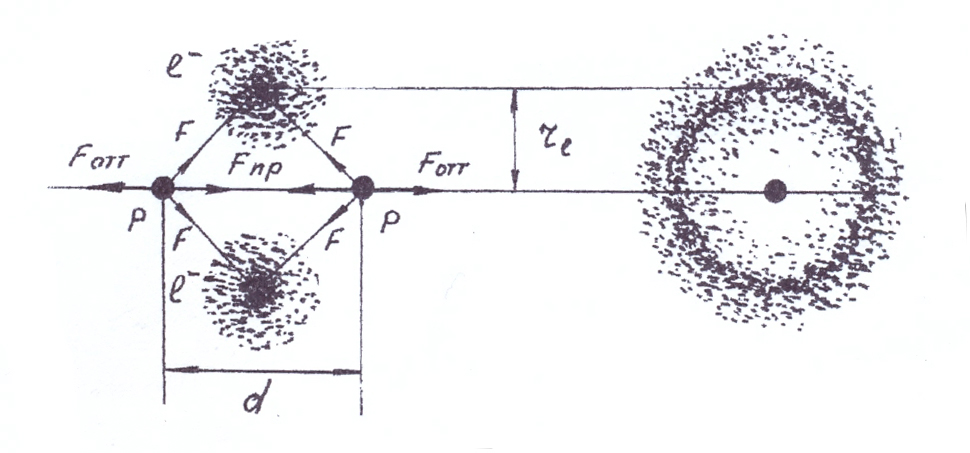
Model of the hydrogen molecule and its axial projection

In addition to the model of the atom, Niels Bohr also proposed a model of the chemical bond.

He proposed this model first in the article "Systems containing several nuclei" - the third and last of the classic series of articles by Bohr, published in November 1913 in Philosophical Magazine.

According to his model for a diatomic molecule, the electrons of the atoms of the molecule form a rotating ring whose plane is perpendicular to the axis of the molecule and equidistant from the atomic nuclei. The dynamic equilibrium of the molecular system is achieved through the balance of forces between the forces of attraction of nuclei to the plane of the ring of electrons and the forces of mutual repulsion of the nuclei. The Bohr model of the chemical bond took into account the Coulomb repulsion - the electrons in the ring are at the maximum distance from each other.

Thus, according to this model, the methane molecule is a regular tetrahedron, in which center the carbon nucleus locates, and in the corners - the nucleus of hydrogen. The chemical bond between them forms four two-electron rings, rotating around the lines connecting the center with the corners.

The Bohr model of the chemical bond could not explain the properties of the molecules. Attempts to improve it have been undertaken many times, but have not led to success.

A working theory of chemical bonding was formulated only by quantum mechanics on the basis of the principle of uncertainty and the Pauli exclusion principle. In contrast to the Bohr model of chemical bonding, it turned out that the electron cloud mainly concentrates on the line between the nuclei, providing a Coulomb attraction between them. For many-electron atoms, the valence bond theory, laid down in 1927 by Walter Heitler and Fritz London, was a successful approximation.

== Bibliography ==
- Kragh, Helge (2012). "Ch. 6. Molecules and Other Failures". Niels Bohr and the Quantum Atom: The Bohr Model of Atomic Structure 1913-1925. OUP Oxford. pp. 226–270. ISBN 9780199654987.
- Mehra, Jagdish; Rechenberg, Helmut (2001). "IV.2. The Helium Atom and Other Few-Body Problems". The Historical Development of Quantum Theory. Vol. 1, часть 2. The Quantum Theory of Planck, Einstein, Bohr and Sommerfeld: Its Foundation and the Rise of Its Difficulties 1900—1925. Springer. pp. 391–398, 422. ISBN 9780387951751.
