= Lucy Mensing =

German theoretical physicist

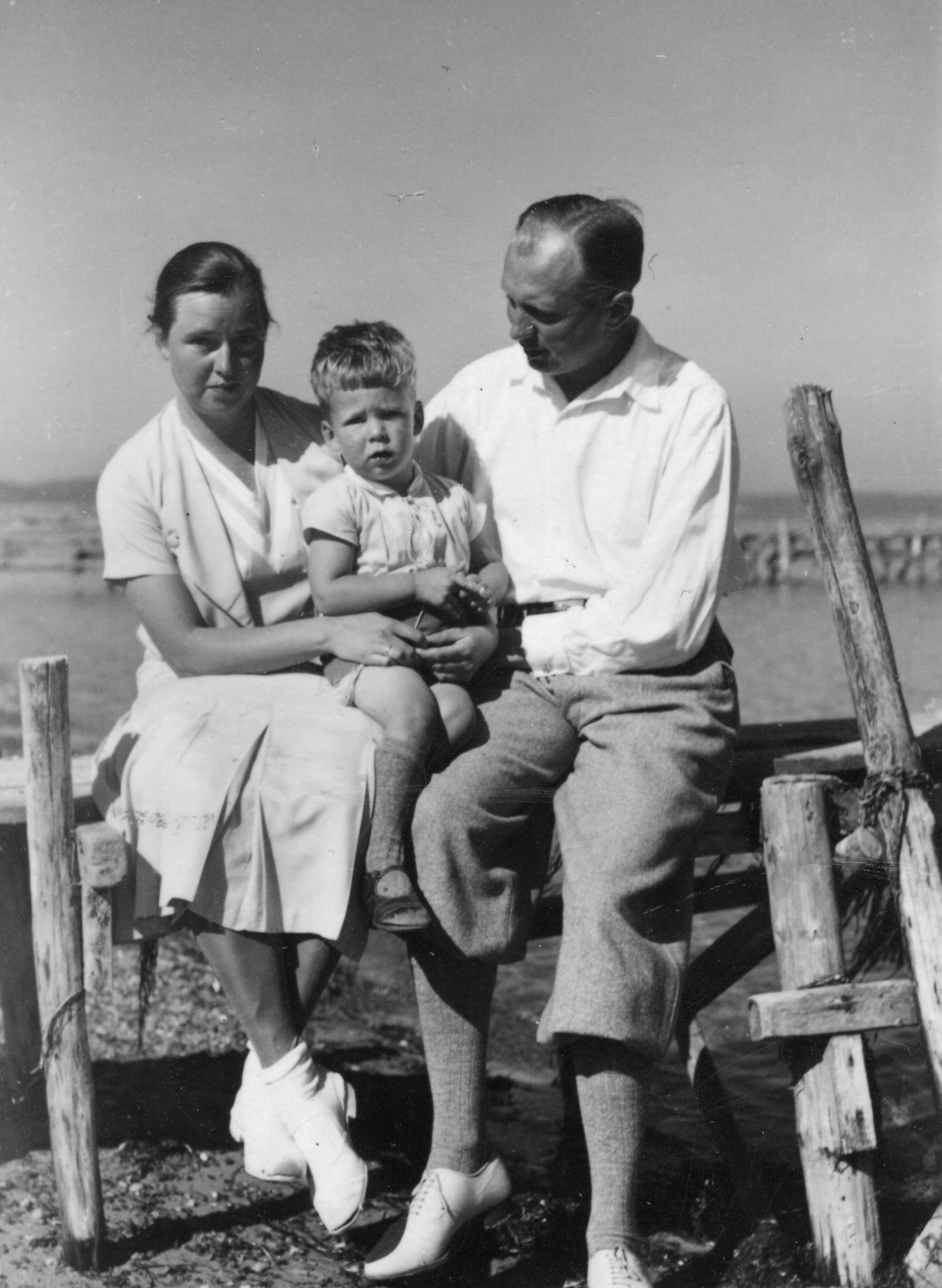
- Lucy Mensing, left, with son and husband Wilhelm Schütz
- Born: 11 March 1901; Hamburg, Germany
- Died: 28 April 1995 (aged 94); Meiningen, Germany
- Citizenship: German
- Education: University of Hamburg
- Scientific career
- Thesis: Beitrag zur Theorie der Verbreiterung von Spektrallinien (1925)
- Doctoral advisor: Wilhelm Lenz

Lucy Mensing, later Mensing-Schütz or Schütz, (11 March 1901 – 28 April 1995) was a German physicist and a pioneer of quantum mechanics.

She may have been the first person to apply quantum mechanics to diatomic molecules.

== Scientific career ==
Mensing studied mathematics, physics and chemistry at the University of Hamburg. During her studies she specialized in theoretical physics. In 1923/24 she wrote a thesis in which she applied the older quantum hypothesis based on Bohr-Sommerfeld's theory, which assumes electron trajectories, to diatomic molecules. This work was published in the Zeitschrift für Physik in 1925. In 1925 she received her doctorate under Wilhelm Lenz with a thesis on the influence of electric fields on the width of spectral lines.

After her doctorate, she got the opportunity to come to Göttingen and take part in the development of quantum mechanics, where she was advised by Pascual Jordan. She studied the rotational spectrum of diatomic molecules using the methods of matrix mechanics.

After Wolfgang Pauli's treatment of the hydrogen atom, this was one of the first applications of the new quantum mechanics to physical systems. In the course of this work she was the first to find the permissible values for the quantum mechanical orbital angular momentum. The results were published in the Zeitschrift für Physik in 1926.

In Hamburg she worked together with Wolfgang Pauli on the calculation of the electrical polarizability of gases from diatomic molecules with the help of matrix mechanics. The result was also published in 1926 in the Physikalische Zeitschrift. This work was another milestone in the application of quantum mechanics.

She then published in 1926 on the matrix mechanics applied to the partial Paschen-Back effect in continuation of the work of Werner Heisenberg and Pascual Jordan.

In 1926, Alfred Landé offered her a position in Tübingen, which she accepted. There she considered the scattering of slow electrons on atoms, about which she wrote a publication in 1927.

She published her last journal article in 1930 on the broadening of spectral lines.

== Private life ==
Lucy Luise Martha Mensing was born in Hamburg. Her parents were the merchant Hermann Mensing and his wife Martha.

In Tübingen she met the physicist Wilhelm Schütz (1900–1972). He had received his doctorate from Walther Gerlach, and dealt experimentally with spectroscopy. Later he was a professor in Jena. At the time they met, he was assistant to Walther Gerlach. The two married in 1928. After the birth of her first son in 1930, she ended her scientific career and mainly took care of her family. She had a second son and two daughters. Lucy Mensing continued to follow what was happening in physics, maintained contacts with colleagues, and supported her husband in his work, for example by preparing scripts for his lectures. As a contribution to her husband's 1936 Handbuch der Experimentalphysik, she wrote a section on the quantum mechanical theory of the Faraday effect. She had a lifelong friendship with Ernst Ising.

The family moved to Munich in 1929 and to Königsberg in 1936. Shortly before the end of the Second World War, they fled to Jena, where Wilhelm Schütz had set up a branch of his institute. During this difficult time, Lucy Schütz gleaned (picking up crops) and worked as a cleaning lady. In March 1946 she found a job in Jena as a trainee assistant at the mathematical institute. In October 1946, the Soviets deported the family to an island in Lake Seliger near Ostashkov as part of the Operation Osoaviakhim. There Lucy Schütz worked as a teacher for German and history at a school for the children of German internees. In June 1952 the family was able to return to Jena.

Lucy Schütz died on April 28, 1995, in Meiningen, Germany.

== Publications ==
- Zur Störungsmechanik der Molekülmodelle. Zeitschrift für Physik, Vol. 34, 1925, p. 602–610
- Beitrag zur Theorie der Verbreiterung von Spektrallinien. Zeitschrift für Physik, Vol. 34, 1925, p. 611–621 (from the dissertation)
- Die Rotations-Schwingungsbanden nach der Quantenmechanik. Zeitschrift für Physik, Vol. 36, 1926, p. 814–823
- Über die Dielektrizitätskonstante von Dipolgasen nach der Quantenmechanik. With Wolfgang Pauli. Physikalische Zeitschrift, Vol. 27, 1926, p. 814–823
- Die Intensitäten der Zeemankomponenten beim partiellen Paschen-Back-Effekt. Zeitschrift für Physik, Vol. 39, 1926, p. 24–28
- Zur Theorie des Zusammenstoßes von Atomen mit langsamen Elektronen. Zeitschrift für Physik, Vol. 45, 1927, p. 603–609
- Zur Theorie der Kopplungsverbreiterung von Spektrallinien. Zeitschrift für Physik, Vol. 61, 1930, p. 655–699

== Literature ==
- Gernot Münster: (K)eine klassische Karriere? Physik Journal, Vol. 19, June 2020, p. 30–34
- Jagdish Mehra, Helmut Rechenberg: The historical development of quantum theory. Springer Verlag, Vol. 3, p. 188 ff
- Münster, Gernot; Janssen, Michel (2025). "Angular and Career Momentum: What Lucy Mensing Contributed to Physics and Why She Left the Field". In Charbonneau, Patrick; Frank, Michelle; van der Heijden, Margriet; Monaldi, Daniela (eds.). Women in the History of Quantum Physics. Cambridge University Press. pp. 102–148. ISBN 9781009535830.
- Gernot Münster (January 2026). "Lucy Mensing". Physik Journal (in German). 25 (1). Weinheim: Wiley-VCH Verlag GmbH & Co.: 42–44. ISSN 1617-9439.
