= Fossel =

Fossel is a surname. Notable people with the surname include:

- Jon S. Fossel (born 1942), American politician
- Leslie Fossel, American politician
- Michael Fossel (born 1950), American professor of clinical medicine and author

== See also ==
- Fassel, surname
- Kossel
