= Fassel =

Fassel (translated "barrel") is a surname of German origin. Notable people with the surname include:

- Gerda Fassel (1941–2025), Austrian sculptor
- Hirsch Bär Fassel, (1802 – 1883), pioneer of the Reform Judaism movement
- Jim Fassel (1949–2021), American football coach
- John Fassel (born 1974), American football coach
- Preston Fassel (born 1985), Jewish-American writer

== See also ==
- Fasel, surname
- Fossel, surname
