= Fixed orbit =

A fixed orbit is the concept, in atomic physics, where an electron is considered to remain in a specific orbit, at a fixed distance from an atom's nucleus, for a particular energy level. The concept was promoted by quantum physicist Niels Bohr c. 1913. The idea of the fixed orbit is considered a major component of the Bohr model (or Bohr theory).
