= Arthur Erich Haas =

Austrian physicist

- Born: April 30, 1884; Brno, Austria
- Died: February 20, 1941 (aged 56); Chicago, Illinois
- Resting place: Cedar Grove Cemetery, Notre Dame, Indiana
- Occupation: Physicist

Arthur Erich Haas (April 30, 1884, in Brno – February 20, 1941, in Chicago) was an Austrian physicist, noted for a 1910 paper he submitted in support of his habilitation as Privatdocent at the University of Vienna that outlined a treatment of the hydrogen atom involving quantization of electronic orbitals, thus anticipating the Bohr model (1913) by three years.

Haas's paper, however, was initially rejected and even ridiculed. As noted in his autobiography, Haas recalls: "When I lectured to the Chemical-Physical Society of Vienna ... Lecher ... referred to the presentation during open discussion as a carnival joke" (the lecture was held during carnival time in Austria, February 1910). Soon thereafter, however, by September 1911 at a physical science convention in Karlsruhe, former detractors of Haas's work acknowledged it with greater enthusiasm as noted in a footnote: "We do not know what caused [a] change of mind in 1911 and can merely suggest the general trend of thinking at the time: 1910 saw the beginning of a universal shift of opinion of the quantum concept."

The significance of Haas's work lay in the establishment of a relationship between the Planck constant and atomic dimensions, having been first to correctly estimate the magnitude of what is today known as the Bohr radius.

From 1936 to his death he was professor at the University of Notre Dame.

== Acceptance at the 1911 Solvay Conference ==
During the proceedings of the first Solvay Conference in 1911 at which Bohr's mentor, Rutherford was present. Max Planck's lecture ended with this remark: "... atoms or electrons subject to the molecular bond would obey the laws of quantum theory." Hendrik Lorentz in the discussion of Planck's lecture raised the question of the composition of the atom based on Thompson's model with a great portion of the discussion around the Quantum atom developed by Arthur Erich Haas. Lorentz explained that due to the dimension of the Planck constant, it defined the atom. Haas's model of the atom is mentioned seventeen times during the Proceedings of the Conference. Planck uses Haas's model in his speech, saying: "A. E. Haas, for example, takes as oscillator the uniform sphere of J. J. Thomson, within which an electron can oscillate around the center. The maximum energy for this oscillation, which is reached when the amplitude becomes equal to the radius of the sphere, must be equal to the quantum of energy e = hν."

== Works ==
- Die Grundgleichungen der Mechanik dargestellt auf Grund der geschichtlichen Entwicklung, Leipzig: Veit, 1914.
- Einführung in die theoretische Physik (2 volumes) 1. online Leipzig: Veit, 1919; 2. Berlin: de Gruyter, 1921. English translation: Introduction to Theoretical Physics, translated by T. Verschoyle, London: Constable, 1925.
- Naturbild der Neuen Physik, Berlin: de Gruyter, 1920. English translation: The New Physics, translated by R. Lawson, London: Methuen, 1923.
- Atomtheorie, Berlin: de Gruyter, 1924. English translation: Atomic Theory: An Elementary Exposition, translated by T. Verschoyle, London: Constable, 1927.
- Materiewellen und Quantenmechanik, Leipzig: Akademische Verlagsgesellschaft, 1928. English translation: Wave Mechanics and the New Quantum Theory, translated by L. W. Codd, London: Constable, 1928.
- Die Grundlagen der Quantenchemie, Leipzig: Akademische Verlagsgesellschaft, 1929. Revised English translation: Quantum Chemistry: A Short Introduction in Four Non-Mathematical Lectures, translated by L. W. Codd, New York: R. R. Smith, 1930.
- Die kosmologischen Probleme der Physik, Leipzig: Akademische Verlagsgesellschaft, 1934.
- Umwaldlungen der chemischen Elemente, Berlin: de Gruyter, 1935.
- Physik für Jedermann, mit besonderer Berücksichtigung der modernen technischen Anwendungen, Berlin: Verlag von Julius Springer, 1933 (popular scientific).

== See also ==
- Bohr model
- History of quantum mechanics
