= Guye =

Guye may refer to:

- Guye District, in Tangshan, Hebei, China
- Guye Peak, mountain in Washington State, United States
- Denis Guye (1901–1986), English rower
- Philippe A. Guye (1862-1922), Swiss chemist
- Charles-Eugène Guye (1866-1942), his brother, Swiss physicist
- Guye (river), a river in Burgundy, France
