= Verschaffelt =

Verschaffelt is the name of

- Peter Anton von Verschaffelt, a Belgian sculptor and architect
- Ambroise Verschaffelt, a Belgian botanist
- Jules-Émile Verschaffelt, a Belgian physicist
