= Fasel =

Fasel is a surname. Notable people with the surname include:

- Carola Fasel (born 1997), Swiss footballer
- Charles Fasel (1898–1984), Swiss ice hockey player
- Daniel Fasel (born 1967), Swiss football defender
- John Fasel (c. 1881–?) American man known for eating habits
- René Fasel (born 1950), Swiss retired ice hockey administrator

== See also ==
- Fasel Gang, group of Swiss criminals
- Fassel, surname
