= Émile Henriot (chemist) =

French chemist (1885–1961)

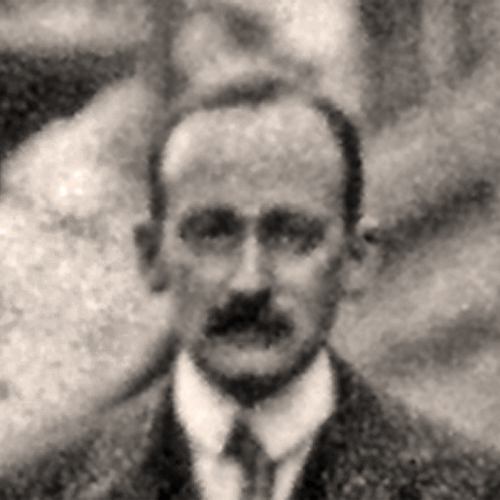
- in 1927 at the Solvay Conference
- Born: July 2, 1885; Besançon, France
- Died: February 1, 1961 (aged 75); Uccle, Belgium
- Citizenship: French
- Education: Sorbonne
- Known for: First to show definitively that potassium and rubidium are naturally radioactive.
- Scientific career
- Fields: Chemistry
- Doctoral advisor: Marie Curie
- Doctoral students: Pol Duwez

Émile Henriot (English: /ɒ̃ˈriːoʊ/ ahn-REE-oh, French: [emil ɑ̃ʁjo]; 2 July 1885 – 1 February 1961) was a French chemist notable for being the first to show definitively that potassium and rubidium are naturally radioactive.

He investigated methods to generate extremely high angular velocities and found that suitably placed air jets can be used to spin tops at very high speeds—this technique was later used to construct ultracentrifuges.

He was a pioneer in the study of the electron microscope. He also studied birefringence and molecular vibrations.

He obtained his DSc in physics in 1912 at the Sorbonne, Paris, under Marie Curie.

As a professor at the Free University of Brussels he attended the Solvay Conferences of 1924, 1927, 1930, 1933, 1948, 1951, and 1954. For many of the conferences, he assisted with preparing the venue or other administrative tasks.

== Bibliography ==
- L. Marton (1961). "Obituaries: Prof. E. Henriot". Nature. 190 (4779): 861. Bibcode:1961Natur.190..861M. doi:10.1038/190861a0.
- Biographie Nationale publiée par L’Académie Royale des Sciences, des Lettres et des Beaux-Arts de Belgique, Établissements Émile Bruylant: 1866–1986, vol. 12 (suppl.), col 421–423.
- Acad. Roy. Belg. Ann., 1964, 130, pp. 47–59.
- Acad. Roy. Sci. Bull. Cl. Sci., 1961, 47, p. 680.
- Le Radium, 1908, 5, pp. 41–46
- Radioactivity in the Natural Environment, in Guide to the Nuclear Wall Chart, at The ABC's of Nuclear Science by Lawrence Berkeley National Laboratory
- Natural Radioactivity and Radiation at National Library of Medicine
- Previous Solvay Conferences on Physics at International Solvay Institutes
