= Édouard Herzen =

Belgian chemist (1877–1936)

Édouard Herzen

Édouard Herzen (Florence, 1877–1936) was a Belgian chemist of Russian descent who played a leading role in the development of physics and chemistry during the twentieth century. He collaborated with industrialist Ernest Solvay, and participated in the first, second, fourth, fifth, sixth and seventh Solvay Conferences (1911, 1913, 1924, 1927, 1930, and 1933).

== Biography ==
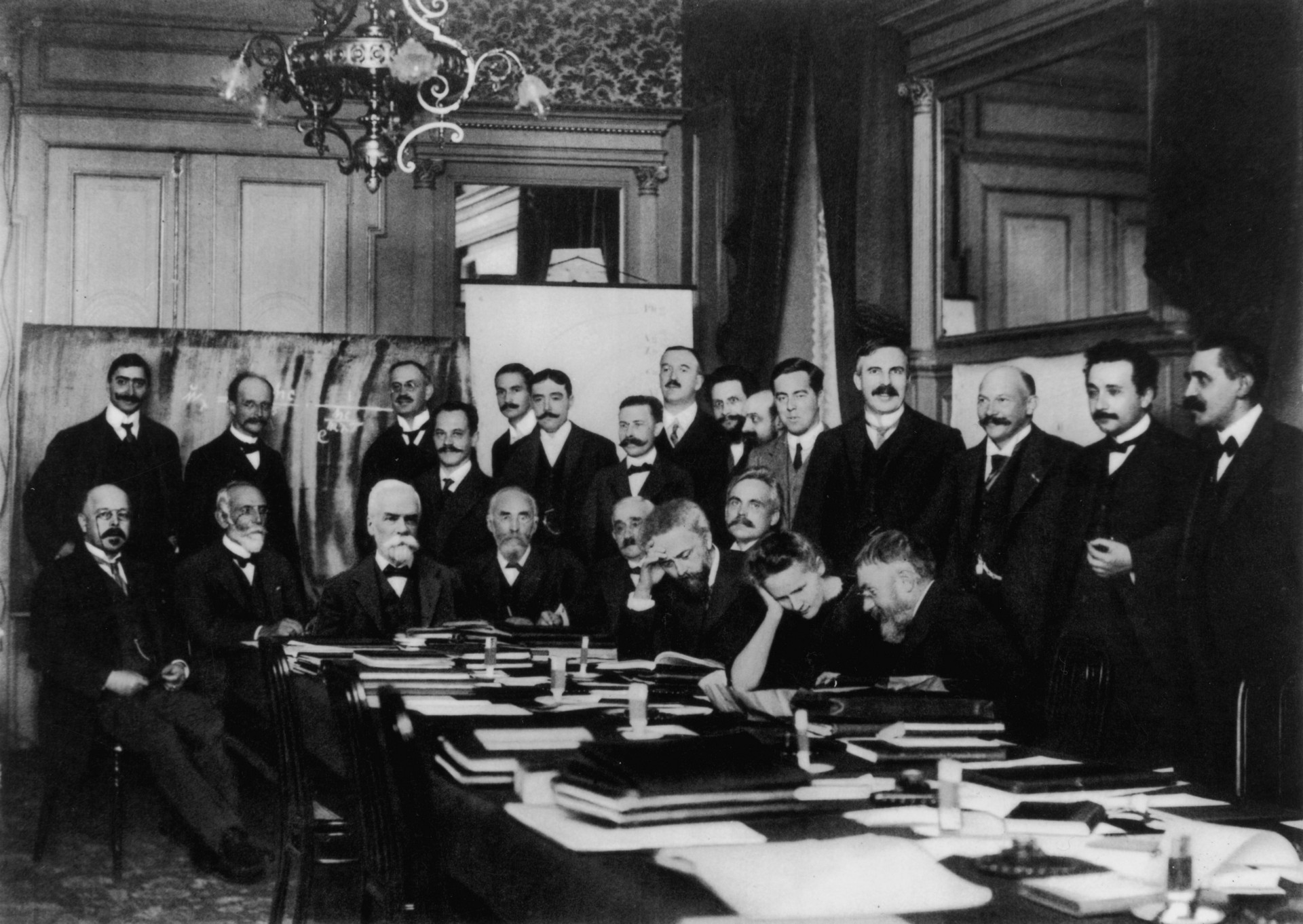
Photograph of the 1911 Solvay Conference at the Hotel Metropole. Herzen is standing, sixth from the right.

Herzen was a grandson of Alexander Herzen, a prominent Russian public figure. In 1902 he published a thesis on Surface Tension. In 1921 he became director of the Division of Physical and Chemical Sciences at the l'Institut des Hautes-Études.

In 1924 he published, in collaboration with the physicist Hendrik Lorentz, a note to the Paris Academy of Sciences entitled The Reports of Energy and Mass After Ernest Solvay. The same year he wrote the popular book La Relativité d'Einstein, published by Editions of New Library of Lausanne.
