= Charles-Eugène Guye =

Swiss physicist (1866–1942)

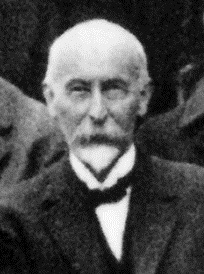
- Guye at the 1927 Solvay Conference
- Born: 15 October 1866; Champvent, Switzerland
- Died: 15 July 1942 (aged 75); Geneva, Switzerland
- Education: University of Geneva
- Known for: Experiments showing electron mass and speed dependence
- Relatives: Philippe-Auguste Guye (brother)
- Scientific career
- Fields: Physics
- Workplaces: Zurich Polytechnic (1894–1900); University of Geneva (1900-1930)

Charles-Eugène Guye (French pronunciation: [ʃaʁl øʒɛn ɡi]; 15 October 1866 – 15 July 1942) was a Swiss experimental physicist noted for his experiments showing the dependence of the electron mass on its speed and for attending the Solvay Conferences.

== Early life and education ==
Guye was born on 15 October 1866 in Saint-Christophe, a hamlet within the commune of Champvent, Vaud, the son of Philippe Guye and Elise Besançon. His older brother, Philippe-Auguste Guye (1862–1922), was a distinguished chemist. Guye studied physics at the University of Geneva, where he received his doctorate in 1889, studying the phenomenon of optical rotatory dispersion.

== Career ==
From 1890 to 1892 Guye worked as a Privatdozent (lecturer) at the University of Geneva, and from 1894 to 1900 he was a Privatdozent at the Zurich Polytechnic (now the Federal Institute of Technology Zurich), switching his research interests to electrical engineering. Albert Einstein was one of his students at the university. In 1900, Guye was appointed professor of experimental physics and director of the Physics Institute at the University of Geneva.

His research focus was in the fields of electric currents, magnetism, and electrical discharges in gases. Starting in 1907 and continuing for over a decade, he and his students Simon Ratnowsky and Charles Lavanchy conducted experiments with cathode rays that demonstrated the dependence of the electron mass on its speed, with results supporting the predictions of Lorentz, Einstein, and the special theory of relativity against Max Abraham's rival theory of the electron. Catherine Chamié wrote her doctoral thesis ‘The Influence of the Rate of Variation of the Magnetising Field on Alternating Hysteresis’ under his supervision.

Guye was president both of the Swiss Physical Society, from 1914 to 1916, and of the Société de Physique et d'Histoire naturelle de Genève. Furthermore, he was editor-in-chief of Archives des Sciences physiques et naturelles and a member of the editorial board of Helvetica Physica Acta.

He participated in the 5th (Leiben, 1927) and 7th (Paris, 1933) Solvay Conferences, and was the author or co-author of over 200 papers in physics and several popular books, including philosophical works on the biological-physical-chemical basis of evolution and the limits of physics and biology.

He retired in 1930 and was conferred by the University the title of "honorary professor".

Guye died in Geneva on Wednesday, 15 July 1942.

== Commemoration ==
In 2017 the European Physical Society declared the Bastions building of the University of Geneva as an EPS Historic Site in honour of the scientific achievements made by Guye and Ernst Stueckelberg in this building.
