= Thomas Lecuit =

French biologist

Thomas Lecuit, born 4 October 1971 in Saumur, is a French biologist specializing in the emergence of forms or morphogenesis. He is a professor at the Collège de France, holding the Dynamics of Life Chair. He leads a research team at the Institut de Biologie du Développement de Marseille (IBDM), and the Turing Centre for Living Systems, an interdisciplinary centre dedicated to the study of living organisms.

== Biography ==
Thomas Lecuit grew up in Saumur, from medical parents who gave him a broad education, open to the arts, the humanities and science. He develops early a marked attraction for the things of nature, which arouse his curiosity. After a scientific baccalaureate (1989) he began studies in the preparatory class at the Lycée Sainte Geneviève, and in 1991 he entered the École Normale Supérieure.

In 1993-1994, he completed a decisive research internship at the Rockefeller University in New York under the direction of Claude Desplan, who introduced him to the world of research.

Pursuing his interest in the study of development, he completed his thesis at the EMBL in Heidelberg, under the supervision of Stephen Cohen. His work focuses on developmental genetics, that is, the way genes called morphogens orchestrate the identity of cells at a distance.

In 1998, Thomas Lecuit extended the study of developmental genetics to the analysis of its cellular bases during a postdoctoral fellowship at Princeton University with Eric Wieschaus, winner of the 1995 Nobel Prize in Physiology and Medicine. He is interested in cell dynamics and polarization, the starting point for a study of developmental dynamics.

Recruited at the CNRS in 2001 as a research fellow, he returned to France at the Institute of Developmental Biology in Marseille. He set up a research team on tissue architecture and plasticity which led him to unify genetic, cellular and physical approaches to morphogenesis.

His research focuses on the mechanical forces that generate cell and tissue movement and how developmental genes organize these forces. He was appointed director of research at the CNRS in 2006 and again in 2010, second class and then first class.

In 2014, Thomas Lecuit was elected to the French Academy of sciences. In 2016 he was appointed Professor at the Collège de France, holding the Dynamiques du Vivant chair. His inaugural lecture was delivered on 27 April 2017.

Thomas Lecuit's research is interdisciplinary and brings together biologists and physicists. Thomas Lecuit directs the Turing Centre for Living Systems in Marseille, an interdisciplinary centre dedicated to the study of life through collaborations between biologists, physicists, computer scientists and mathematicians.

== Scientific contributions ==
Thomas Lecuit's scientific contributions address the general question of the origin of forms in biology and the nature of morphogenetic information.

To this end, he studies the Drosophila fly, a powerful model system for the study of development. The twentieth century was marked by the discovery of genetic determinisms of development, in particular the genes that define the cellular position information in an embryo, i.e. their spatial coordinates. In 1995-1998, Thomas Lecuit worked on a general way of organizing positional information by so-called morphogenic factors. Morphogens were first proposed by the mathematician Alan Turing in 1954, as factors organizing form according to purely physico-chemical principles of reaction-diffusion. Lewis Wolpert in 1969 and Francis Crick in 1971 proposed a more precise definition, as factors that form a concentration gradient at the origin of positional information. Thomas Lecuit shows that the growth factors of the BMP/Dpp and Wg/Wnt families are morphogens, acting at a distance, whose local concentration constitutes positional information that spatially organizes cell identity and limb axes. He focuses his attention on the close relationship between positional information and tissue growth from a dynamic point of view.

From 1998 onwards, as fluorescence imaging in living organisms develops, Thomas Lecuit studies the cellular basis of developmental dynamics. He is interested in the formation of the primordial tissue of the Drosophila embryo, a process called cellularization, and discovers the origins of membrane dynamics and its polarization.

Since 2001, Thomas Lecuit has been studying how genes orchestrate the cellular movements that cause changes in the shape of embryonic tissues. His research includes characterization of the physical principles of morphogenesis, along the lines of the work begun by d'Arcy Thompson in On Growth and Form (1917). His team first discovered the nature of the mechanical forces that cause tissue plasticity, namely the contractile forces that reshape the shape and cellular interactions and their division. They also study the nature of cohesive forces through intercellular adhesion. Contractile forces are organized in space and time and are polarized in privileged directions. Several articles reveal how embryonic position information orchestrates cell mechanics in space and time. This work is discussed in a broader perspective in several journals.

Since 2010, Thomas Lecuit and his colleagues have been highlighting the limits of a tradition that has largely seen development as the strict execution of a deterministic program governed by hierarchically regulated genes. Several studies indicate that it is also appropriate to consider statistical laws of organization, without hierarchy but with many feedbacks of a mechano-chemical nature. This work reveals the importance of self-organization during development and allows for a renewed definition of biological information that combines genetics, mechanics and geometry.

== Awards ==
- Elected member of the French Academy of sciences (2014)
- Elected member of Academia Europaea (2014)
- Liliane Bettencourt Prize for Life Sciences (2015)
- Bronze medal (2006) then Silver medal (2015) from the CNRS
- Grand Prix Victor Noury of the French Academy of sciences (2011)
- Elected member of EMBO (2009)
- Antoine Laccassagne Prize of the Collège de France (2009)
- Schlumberger Foundation Awards for Education and Research (2004)
- Officer of the Palmes Académiques
