= Jules-Émile Verschaffelt =

Belgian physicist

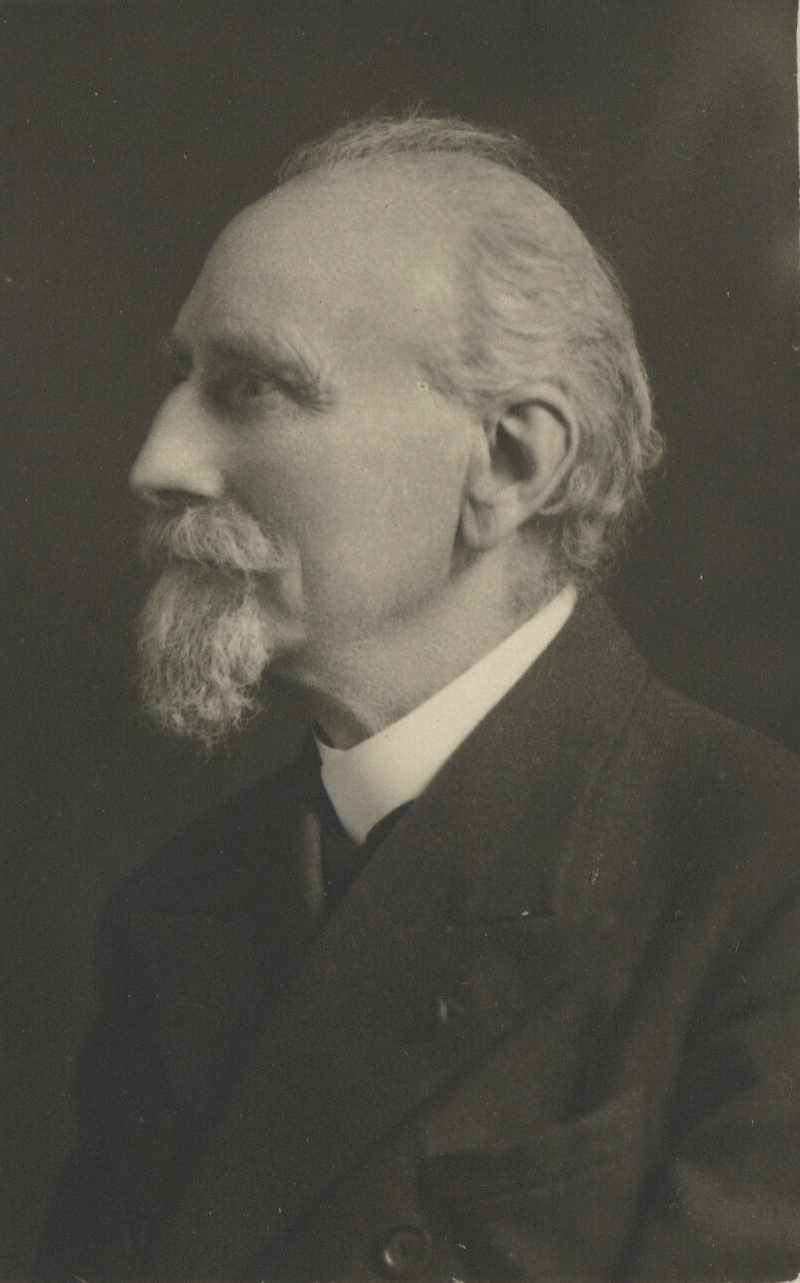
Verschaffelt

Jules-Émile Verschaffelt (27 January 1870 in Ghent – 22 December 1955) was a Belgian physicist. He worked at Kamerlingh Onnes's laboratory in Leiden from 1894 to 1906 and once again from 1914 to 1923. From 1906 to 1914 he worked at the Vrije Universiteit Brussel and from 1923 to 1940 at the Ghent University. He was one of the participants of the fifth Solvay Conference on Physics that took place at the International Solvay Institute for Physics in Belgium.
