= Solvay Conference =

Belgium academic gatherings since 1911

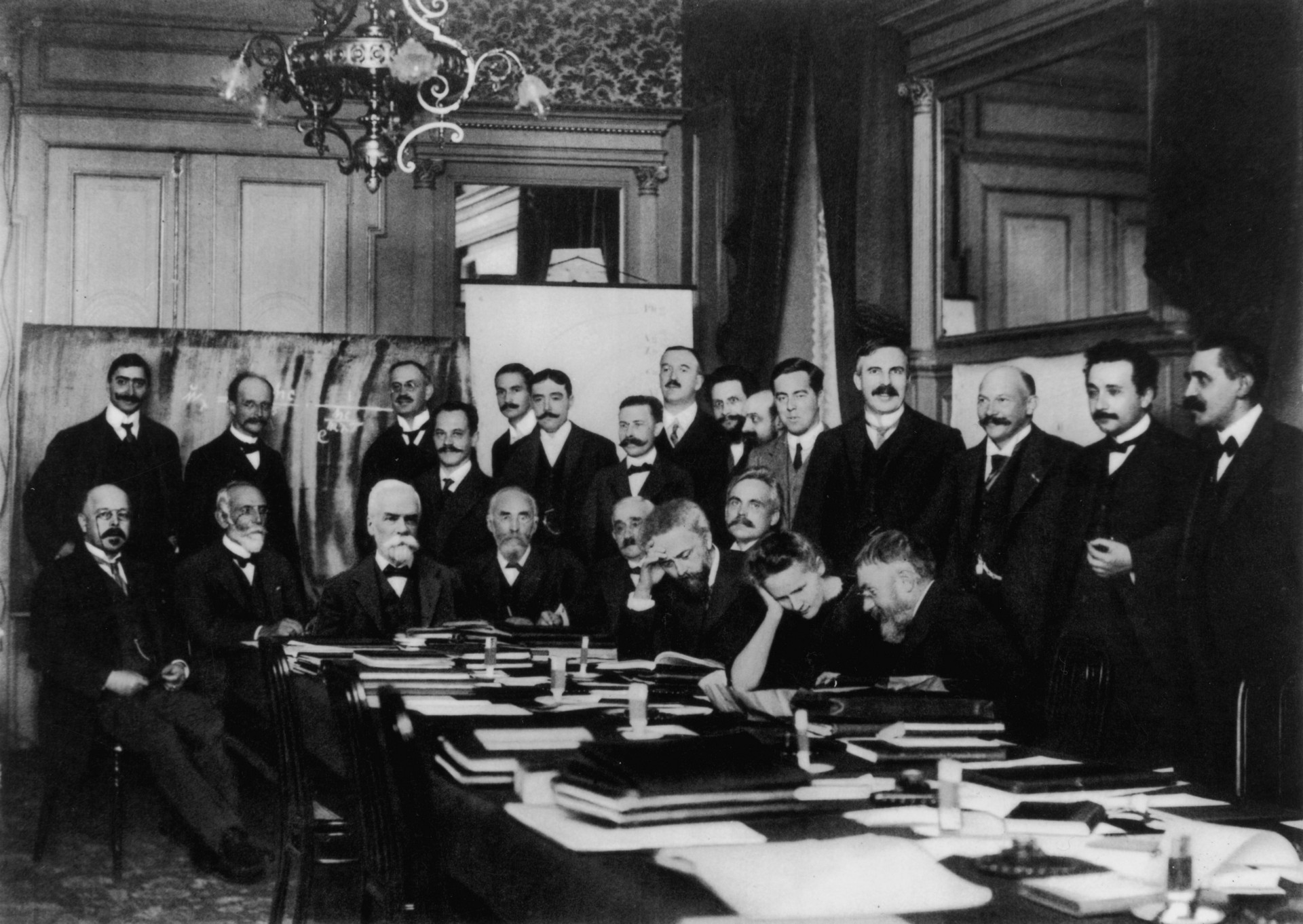
Photograph of the first conference, 2 November, 1911, at the Hotel Metropole Seated (L–R): W. Nernst, M. Brillouin, E. Solvay, H. Lorentz, E. Warburg, J. Perrin, W. Wien, M. Skłodowska-Curie, and H. Poincaré. Standing (L–R): R. Goldschmidt, M. Planck, H. Rubens, A. Sommerfeld, F. Lindemann, M. de Broglie, M. Knudsen, F. Hasenöhrl, G. Hostelet, E. Herzen, J. H. Jeans, E. Rutherford, H. Kamerlingh Onnes, A. Einstein and P. Langevin.

The Solvay Conferences (French: Congrès Solvay) have been devoted to preeminent unsolved problems in both physics and chemistry. They began with the historic invitation-only 1911 Solvay Conference on Physics, considered a turning point in the world of physics, and are ongoing.

Since the success of 1911, they have been organised by the International Solvay Institutes for Physics and Chemistry, founded by the Belgian industrialist Ernest Solvay in 1912 and 1913, and located in Brussels. The institutes coordinate conferences, workshops, seminars, and colloquia. Recent Solvay Conferences entail a three year cycle: the Solvay Conference on Physics followed by a gap year, followed by the Solvay Conference on Chemistry.

The 1st Solvay Conference on Biology titled "The organisation and dynamics of biological computation" took place in April 2024.

== Notable conferences ==
=== First conference ===
Hendrik Lorentz was chairman of the first Solvay Conference on Physics, held in Brussels from 30 October to 3 November 1911. The subject was Radiation and the Quanta. This conference looked at the problems of having two approaches, namely classical physics and quantum theory. Albert Einstein was the second youngest physicist present (the youngest one was Frederick Lindemann). Other members of the Solvay Congress were experts including Marie Skłodowska-Curie, Ernest Rutherford and Henri Poincaré (see image for attendee list).

=== Third conference ===
The third Solvay Conference on Physics was held in April 1921, soon after World War I. Most German scientists were barred from attending. In protest at this action, Albert Einstein, although he had renounced his German citizenship in 1896 and remained officially stateless until becoming a Swiss citizen in 1901, declined his invitation to attend the conference. Because anti-Semitism had been on the rise, Einstein accepted the invitation by Dr. Chaim Weizmann, the president of the World Zionist Organization, for a trip to the United States to raise money.

=== Fourth conference ===
The fourth Solvay Conference on Physics was held in 1924. These conferences, supported by the King of Belgium, had become the leading international gathering for the discussion of the very latest developments in physics. The subject was "The electrical conductivity of metals and related topics". Scientists based in Germany and Austria were not invited to this Solvay meeting due to the tensions still prevailing after the First World War. Consequently, prominent figures like Planck, Einstein, Sommerfeld, and Born were absent.

=== Fifth conference ===
Perhaps the most famous conference was the fifth Solvay Conference on Physics, which was held from 24 to 29 October 1927. The subject was Electrons and Photons and the world's most notable physicists met to discuss the newly formulated quantum theory. The leading figures were Albert Einstein and Niels Bohr. Seventeen of the 29 attendees were or became Nobel Prize winners, including Marie Skłodowska-Curie who, alone among them, had won Nobel Prizes in two separate scientific disciplines. The anti-German prejudice that had prevented Einstein and others from attending the Solvay conferences held after the First World War had melted away. Essentially all of those names who had contributed to the recent development of the quantum theory were at this Solvay Conference, including Bohr, Born, de Broglie, Dirac, Heisenberg, Pauli, Planck, Lorentz, Compton, Ehrenfest, and Schrödinger. Heisenberg commented:

Through the possibility of exchange between the representatives of different lines of research, this conference has contributed extraordinarily to the clarification of the physical foundations of the quantum theory. It forms, so to speak, the outward completion of the quantum theory.

The photo taken of this conference's participants is sometimes entitled "The Most Intelligent Photo Ever Taken," for its depiction of the world's leading physicists gathered together in one shot.

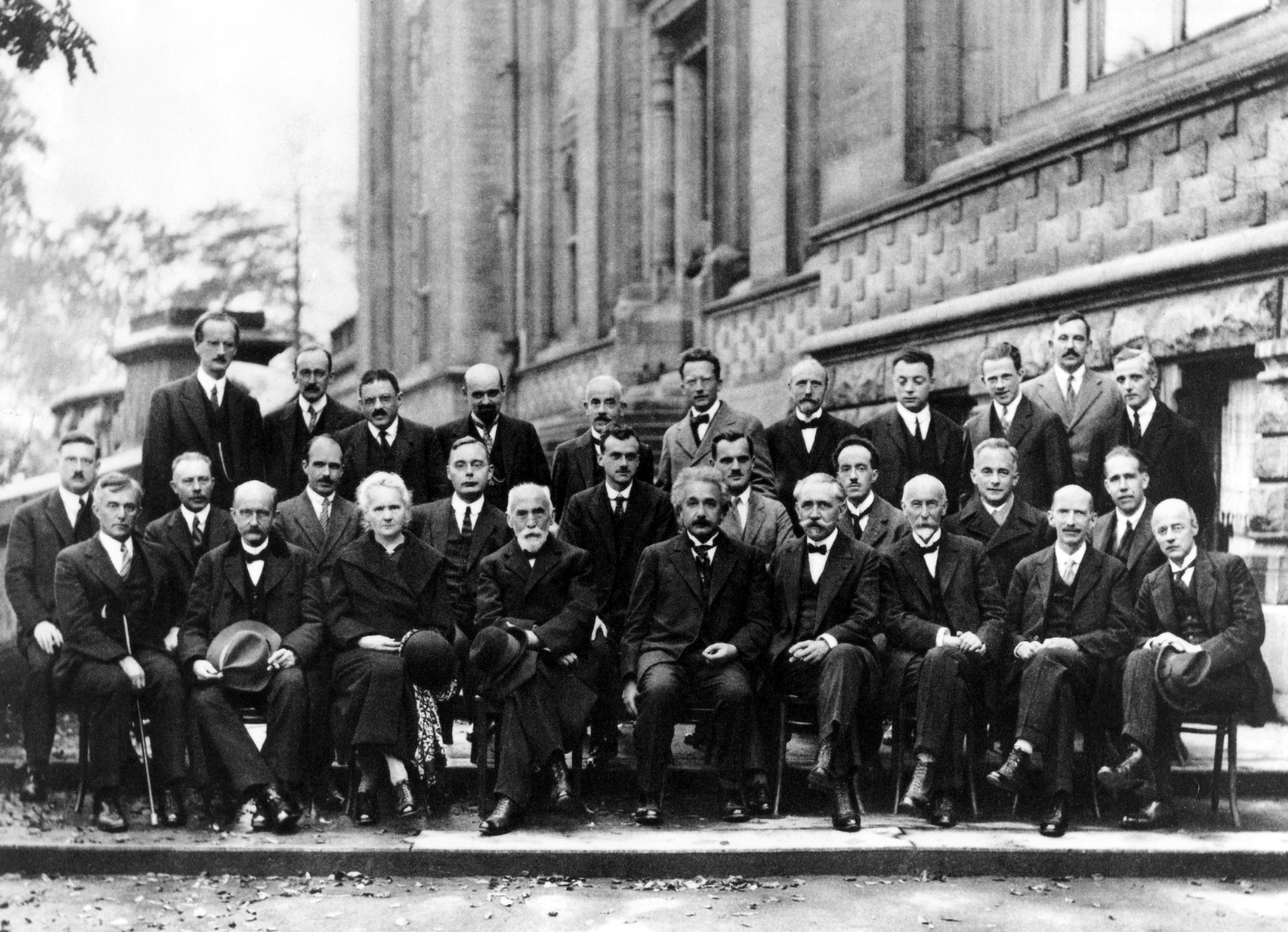
A. Piccard, E. Henriot, P. Ehrenfest, E. Herzen, Th. De Donder, E. Schrödinger, J.E. Verschaffelt, W. Pauli, W. Heisenberg, R.H. Fowler, L. Brillouin; P. Debye, M. Knudsen, W.L. Bragg, H.A. Kramers, P.A.M. Dirac, A.H. Compton, L. de Broglie, M. Born, N. Bohr; I. Langmuir, M. Planck, M. Skłodowska-Curie, H.A. Lorentz, A. Einstein, P. Langevin, Ch. E. Guye, C.T.R. Wilson, O.W. Richardson Fifth conference participants, 1927. Institut International de Physique Solvay in Leopold Park. Image

== Solvay conferences on physics ==
No	Year	Title	Translation	Chair
1	1911	La théorie du rayonnement et les quanta	The theory of radiation and quanta	Hendrik Lorentz (Leiden)
2	1913	La structure de la matière	The structure of matter	Hendrik Lorentz (Leiden)
3	1921	Atomes et électrons	Atoms and electrons	Hendrik Lorentz (Leiden)
4	1924	Conductibilité électrique des métaux et problèmes connexes	Electric conductivity of metals and related problems	Hendrik Lorentz (Leiden)
5	1927	Electrons et photons	Electrons and photons	Hendrik Lorentz (Leiden)
6	1930	Le magnétisme	Magnetism	Paul Langevin (Paris)
7	1933	Structure et propriétés des noyaux atomiques	Structure & properties of the atomic nucleus	Paul Langevin (Paris)
8	1948	Les particules élémentaires	Elementary particles	Lawrence Bragg (Cambridge)
9	1951	L'état solide	The solid state	Lawrence Bragg (Cambridge)
10	1954	Les électrons dans les métaux	Electrons in metals	Lawrence Bragg (Cambridge)
11	1958	La structure et l'évolution de l'univers	The structure and evolution of the universe	Lawrence Bragg (Cambridge)
12	1961	La théorie quantique des champs	Quantum field theory	Lawrence Bragg (Cambridge)
13	1964	The Structure and Evolution of Galaxies		J. Robert Oppenheimer (Princeton)
14	1967	Fundamental Problems in Elementary Particle Physics		Christian Møller (Copenhagen)
15	1970	Symmetry Properties of Nuclei		Edoardo Amaldi (Rome)
16	1973	Astrophysics and Gravitation		Edoardo Amaldi (Rome)
17	1978	Order and Fluctuations in Equilibrium and Nonequilibrium Statistical Mechanics		Léon Van Hove (CERN)
18	1982	Higher Energy Physics		Léon Van Hove (CERN)
19	1987	Surface Science		F. W. de Wette (Austin)
20	1991	Quantum Optics		Paul Mandel (Brussels)
21	1998	Dynamical Systems and Irreversibility		Ioannis Antoniou (Brussels)
22	2001	The Physics of Communication		Ioannis Antoniou (Brussels)
23	2005	The Quantum Structure of Space and Time		David Gross (Santa Barbara)
24	2008	Quantum Theory of Condensed Matter		Bertrand Halperin (Harvard)
25	2011	The Theory of the Quantum World		David Gross
26	2014	Astrophysics and Cosmology		Roger Blandford (Stanford)
27	2017	The Physics of Living Matter: Space, Time and Information in Biology		Boris Shraiman (Santa Barbara)
28	2022	The Physics of Quantum Information		David Gross (Santa Barbara) Peter Zoller (Innsbruck U.)
29	2023	The Structure and Dynamics of Disordered Systems		David Gross (Santa Barbara) Marc Mézard (Bocconi U.) Giorgio Parisi (Sapienza U.)

=== Participants per year ===
The following list of participants is extracted from the proceedings of the Solvay Conferences in Physics stored in the Solvay archives

1948: (scientific committee – present) Sir Lawrence Bragg, Niels Bohr, Théophile De Donder, Sir Owen Willans Richardson, Jules-Émile Verschaffelt, Hendrik Kramers (scientific committee – absent) Peter Debye, Abram Fedorovich Ioffé, Albert Einstein, Frédéric Joliot-Curie (speakers) C. F. Powell, P. Auger, Felix Bloch, Patrick Blackett, Homi J. Bhabha, Marie-Antoinette Tonnelat on behalf of Louis de Broglie, Rudolf Peierls, Walter Heitler, Edward Teller, R. Serber, Léon Rosenfeld (additional participants) H. Casimir, J. Cockroft, P. Dee, Paul Dirac, Ferretti, O. Frisch, Oskar Klein, Leprince-Ringuet, Lise Meitner, Christian Møller, Francis Perrin, J. Robert Oppenheimer, Wolfgang Pauli, P. Scherrer, Erwin Schrödinger (auditeurs) J. Timmermans, G. Balasse, J. Errera, O. Goche, P. Kipfer, L. Flamache, M. Occhialini, Marc de Hemptinne (secrétaires) E. Stahel, J. Géhéniau, Miss Dilworth, Ilya Prigogine, L. Groven, Léon Van Hove, Yves Goldschmidt, MM Van Styvendael, Demeur, Van Isacker (administrative commission) Jules Bordet, Ernest-John Solvay, Dr F. Héger-Gilbert, E. Henriot, F. van den Dungen.

=== Conferences on physics gallery ===
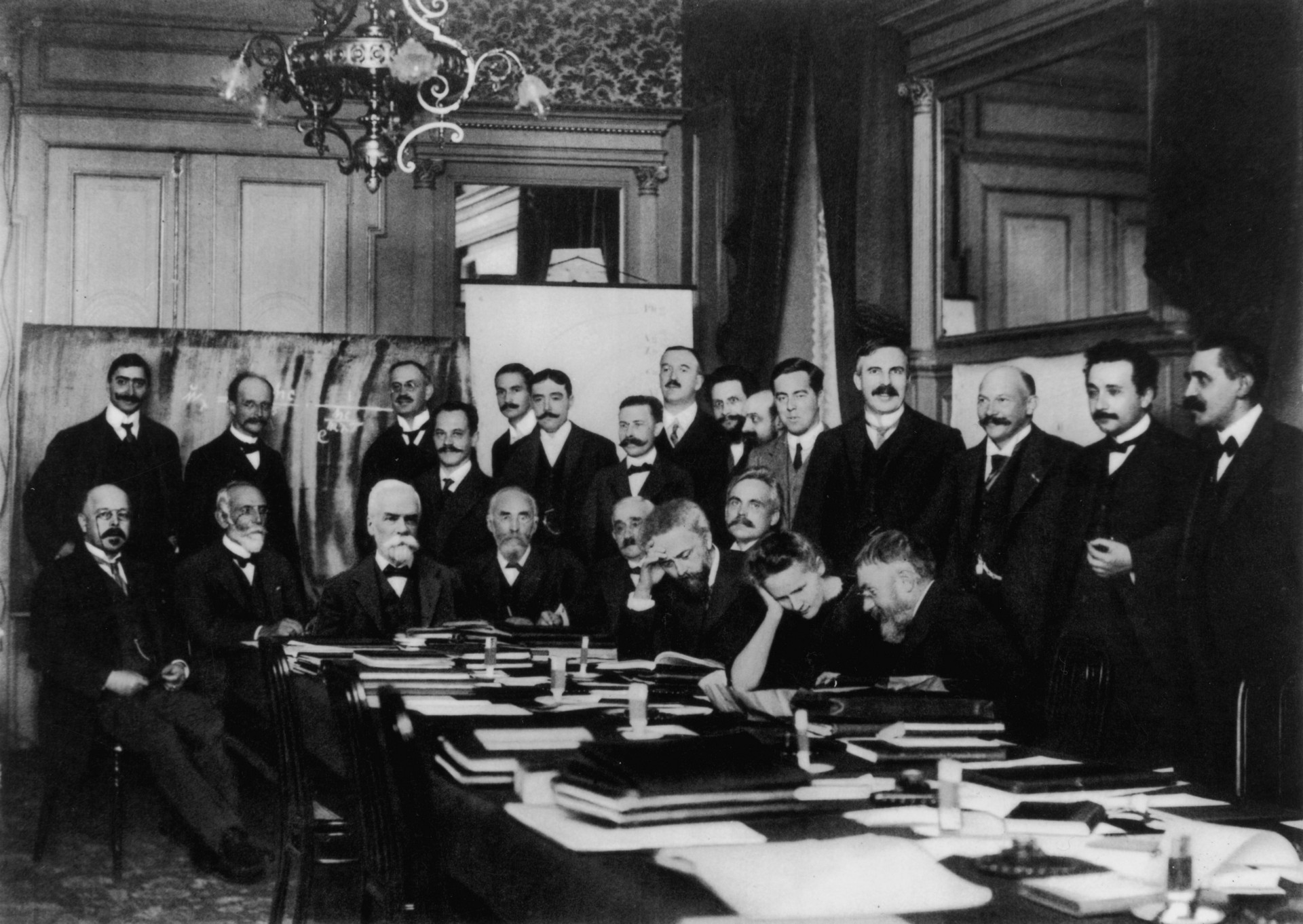
First Conference, 1911

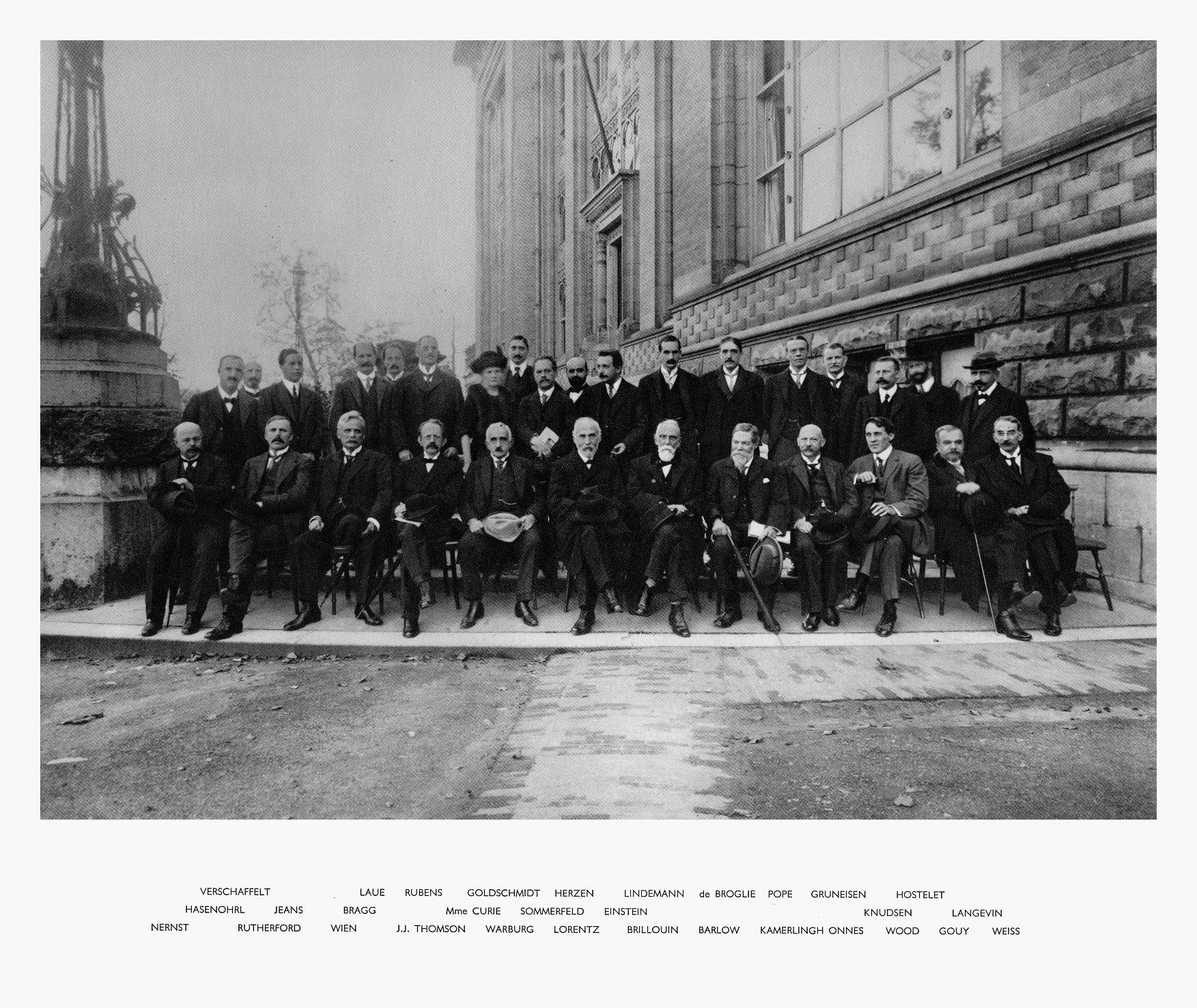
Second Conference, 1913

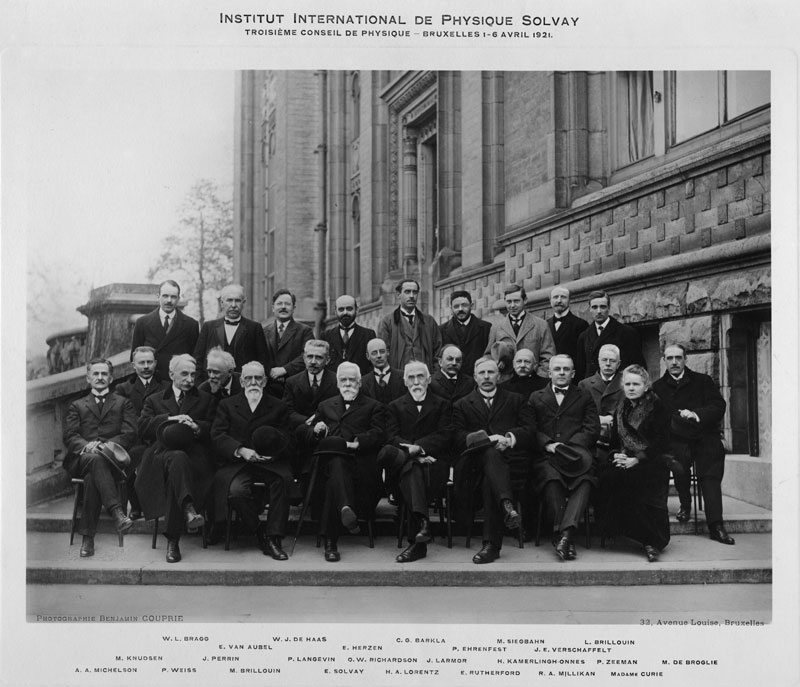
Third Conference, 1921

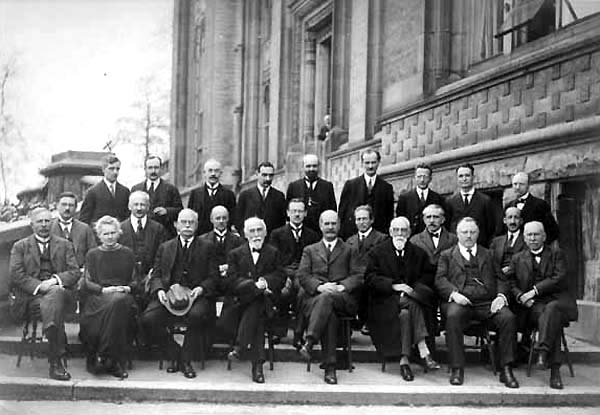
Fourth Conference, 1924

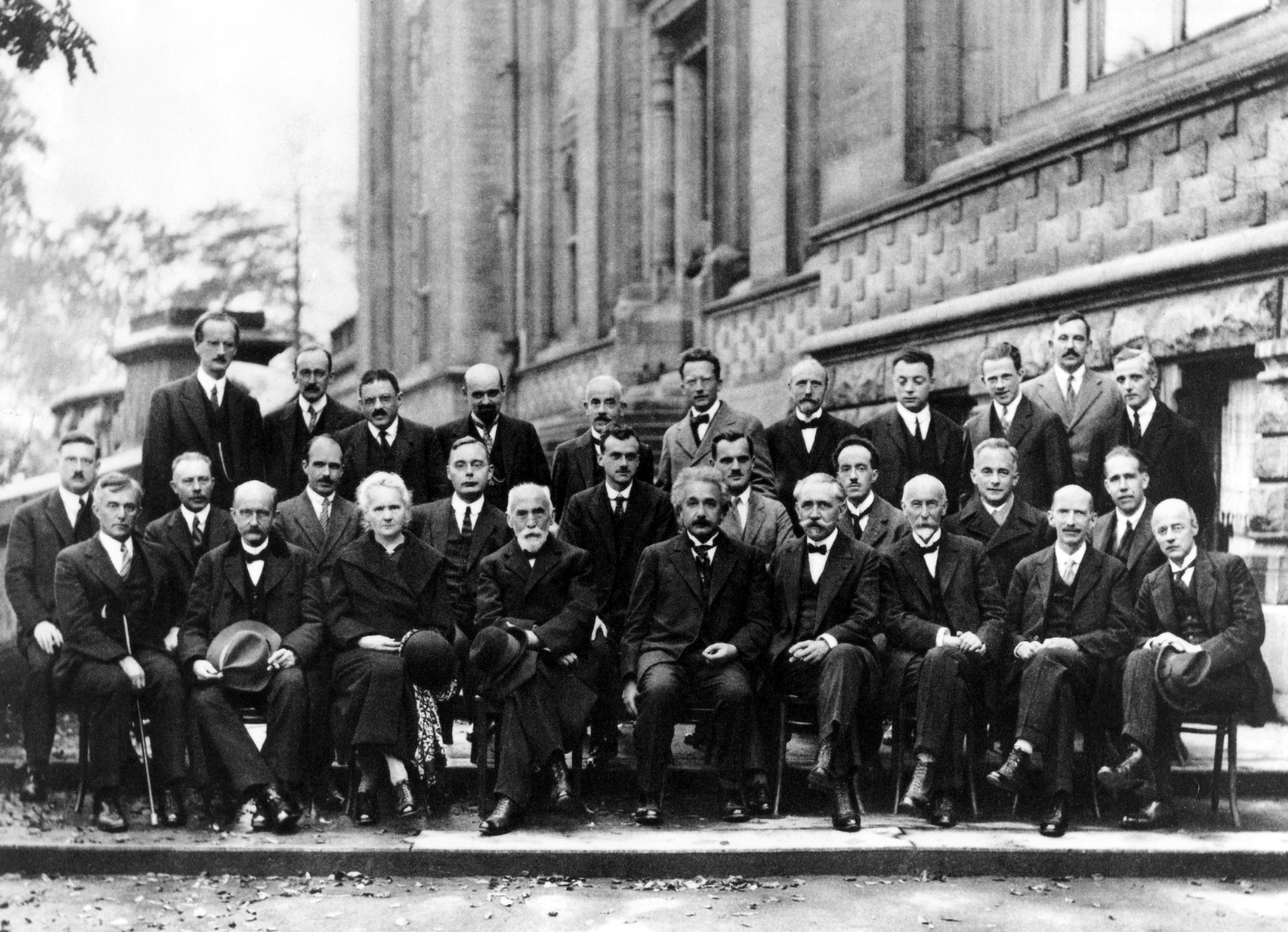
Fifth Conference, 1927. 1st row : Langmuir, Planck, Madame Curie, Lorentz, Einstein, Langevin, Guye, Wilson, Richardson. 2nd row : Debye, Knudsen, W. L. Bragg, Kramers, Dirac, Compton, de Broglie, Born, Bohr. 3rd row : Piccard, Henriot, Ehrenfest, Herzen, De Donder, Schrödinger, Verschaffelt, Pauli, Heisenberg, Fowler, Brillouin.

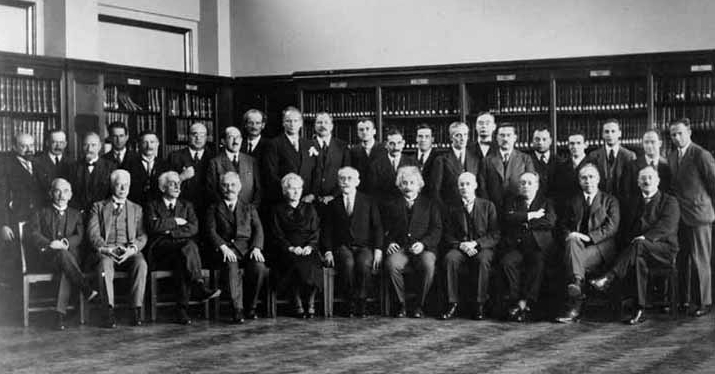
Sixth Conference, 1930. 1st row: Th. De Donder, P. Zeeman, P. Weiss, A. Sommerfeld, M. Skłodowska-Curie, P. Langevin, A. Einstein, O. Richardson, B. Cabrera, N. Bohr, W. J. De Haas; 2nd row: E. Herzen, E. Henriot, J. Verschaffelt, C. Manneback, A. Cotton, J. Errera, O. Stern, A. Piccard, W. Gerlach, C. Darwin, P. A. M. Dirac, H. Bauer, P. Kapitsa, L. Brillouin, H. A. Kramers, P. Debye, W. Pauli, J. Dorfman (ru), J. H. Van Vleck, E. Fermi, W. Heisenberg

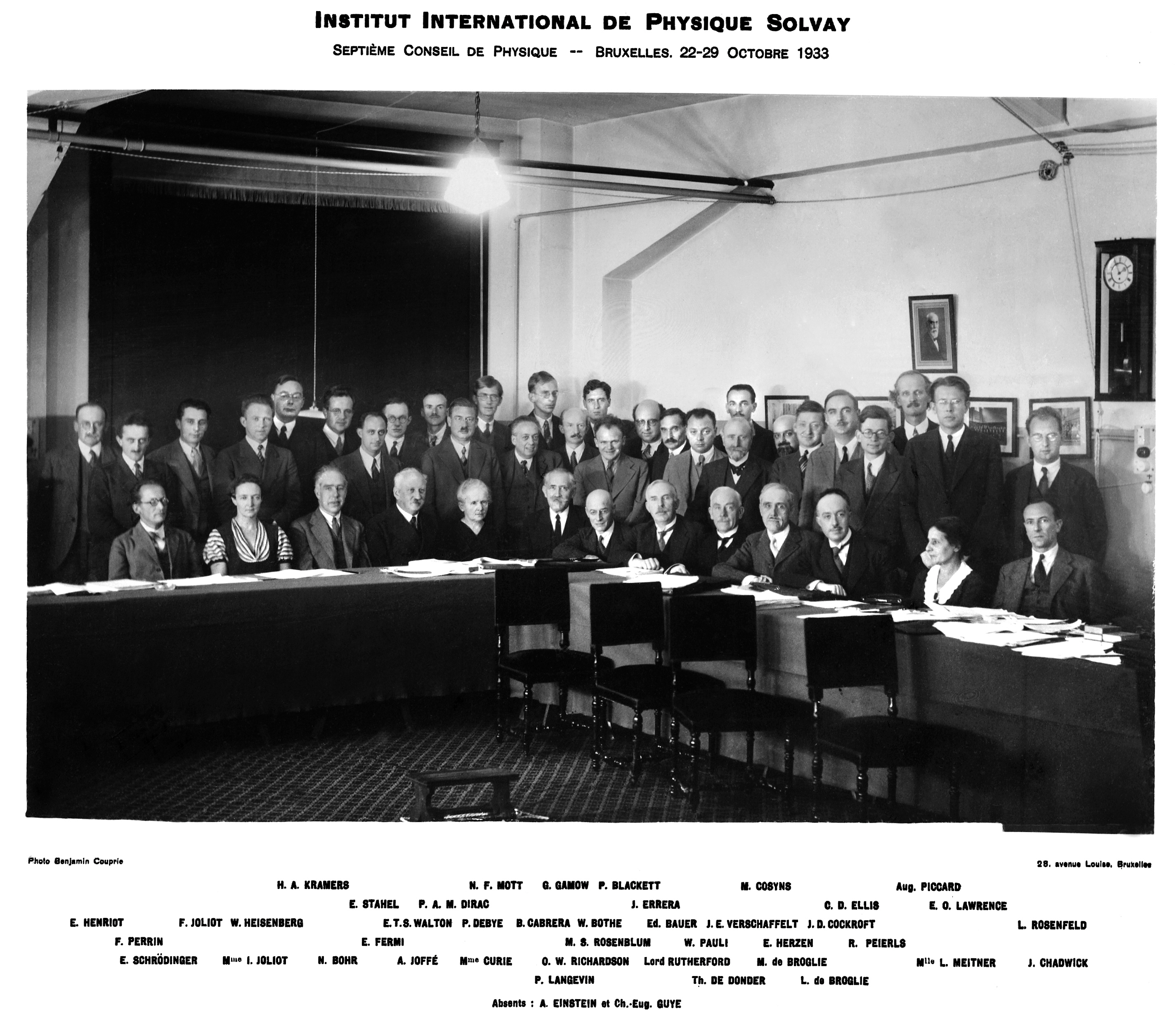
Seventh Conference, 1933

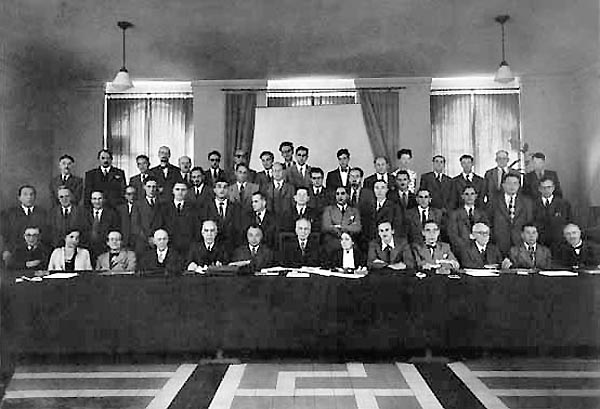
Eighth Conference, 1948

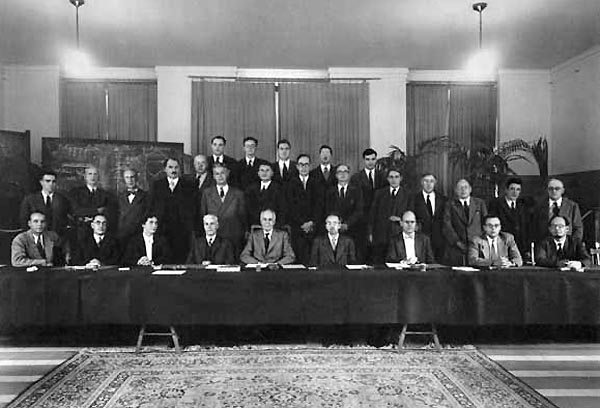
Ninth Conference, 1951. Left to right, sitting: Crussaro, Allen, Cauchois, Borelius, Bragg, Møller, Sietz, Hollomon, Frank; middle row: Rathenau, Koster, Rudberg, Flamache, Goche, Groven, Orowan, Burgers, Shockley, Guinier, C.S. Smith, Dehlinger, Laval, Henriot; top row: Gaspart, Lomer, Cottrell, Homes, Curien

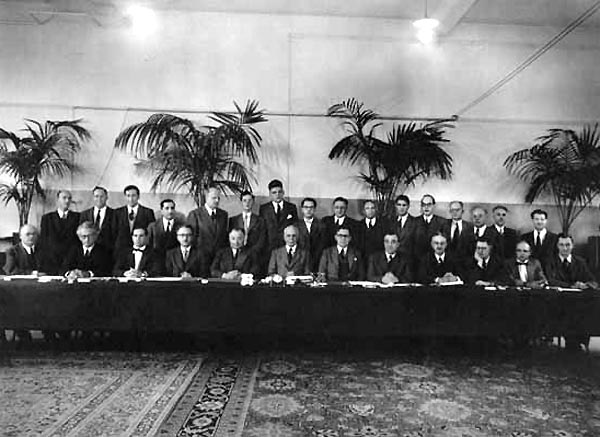
Tenth Conference, 1954

== Solvay conferences on chemistry ==
No	Year	Title	Translation	Chair
1	1922	Cinq Questions d'Actualité	Five topical questions	William Jackson Pope (Cambridge)
2	1925	Structure et Activité Chimique	Structure and Chemical Activity	William Jackson Pope (Cambridge)
3	1928	Questions d'Actualité	Topical Questions	William Jackson Pope (Cambridge)
4	1931	Constitution et Configuration des Molécules Organiques	Constitution and Configuration of Organic Molecules	William Jackson Pope (Cambridge)
5	1934	L'Oxygène, ses réactions chimiques et biologiques	Oxygen, and its chemical and biological reactions.	William Jackson Pope (Cambridge)
6	1937	Les vitamines et les Hormones	Vitamins and Hormones	Frédéric Swarts (Ghent)
7	1947	Les Isotopes	Isotopes	Paul Karrer (Zurich)
8	1950	Le Mécanisme de l'Oxydation	The mechanism of oxidation	Paul Karrer (Zurich)
9	1953	Les Protéines	Proteins	Paul Karrer (Zurich)
10	1956	Quelques Problèmes de Chimie Minérale	Some Problems of Inorganic Chemistry	Paul Karrer (Zurich)
11	1959	Les Nucléoprotéines	Nucleoproteins	Alfred Ubbelohde (London)
12	1962	Transfert d'Energie dans les Gaz	Energy transfer in gases	Alfred Ubbelohde (London)
13	1965	Reactivity of the Photoexcited Organic Molecule		Alfred Ubbelohde (London)
14	1969	Phase Transitions		Alfred Ubbelohde (London)
15	1970	Electrostatic Interactions and Structure of Water		Alfred Ubbelohde (London)
16	1976	Molecular Movements and Chemical Reactivity as conditioned by Membranes, Enzymes and other Molecules		Alfred Ubbelohde (London)
17	1980	Aspects of Chemical Evolution		Alfred Ubbelohde (London)
18	1983	Design and Synthesis of Organic Molecules Based on Molecular Recognition		Ephraim Katchalski (Rehovot) & Vladimir Prelog (Zurich)
19	1987	Surface Science		F. W. de Wette (Austin)
20	1995	Chemical Reactions and their Control on the Femtosecond Time Scale		Pierre Gaspard (Brussels)
21	2007	From Noncovalent Assemblies to Molecular Machines		Jean-Pierre Sauvage (Strasbourg)
22	2010	Quantum Effects in Chemistry and Biology		Graham Fleming (Berkeley)
23	2013	New Chemistry and New Opportunities from the Expanding Protein Universe		Kurt Wüthrich (ETH Zurich)
24	2016	Catalysis in Chemistry and Biology		Kurt Wüthrich (ETH Zurich) & Robert Grubbs (Caltech, USA)
25	2019	Computational Modeling: From Chemistry to Materials to Biology		Kurt Wüthrich (ETH Zurich) & Bert Weckhuysen (Utrecht U., The Netherlands)
26	2022	Chemistry Challenges of the 21st Century		Kurt Wüthrich (ETH Zurich) & Ben Feringa (Groningen U., The Netherlands)

=== Conferences on chemistry gallery ===
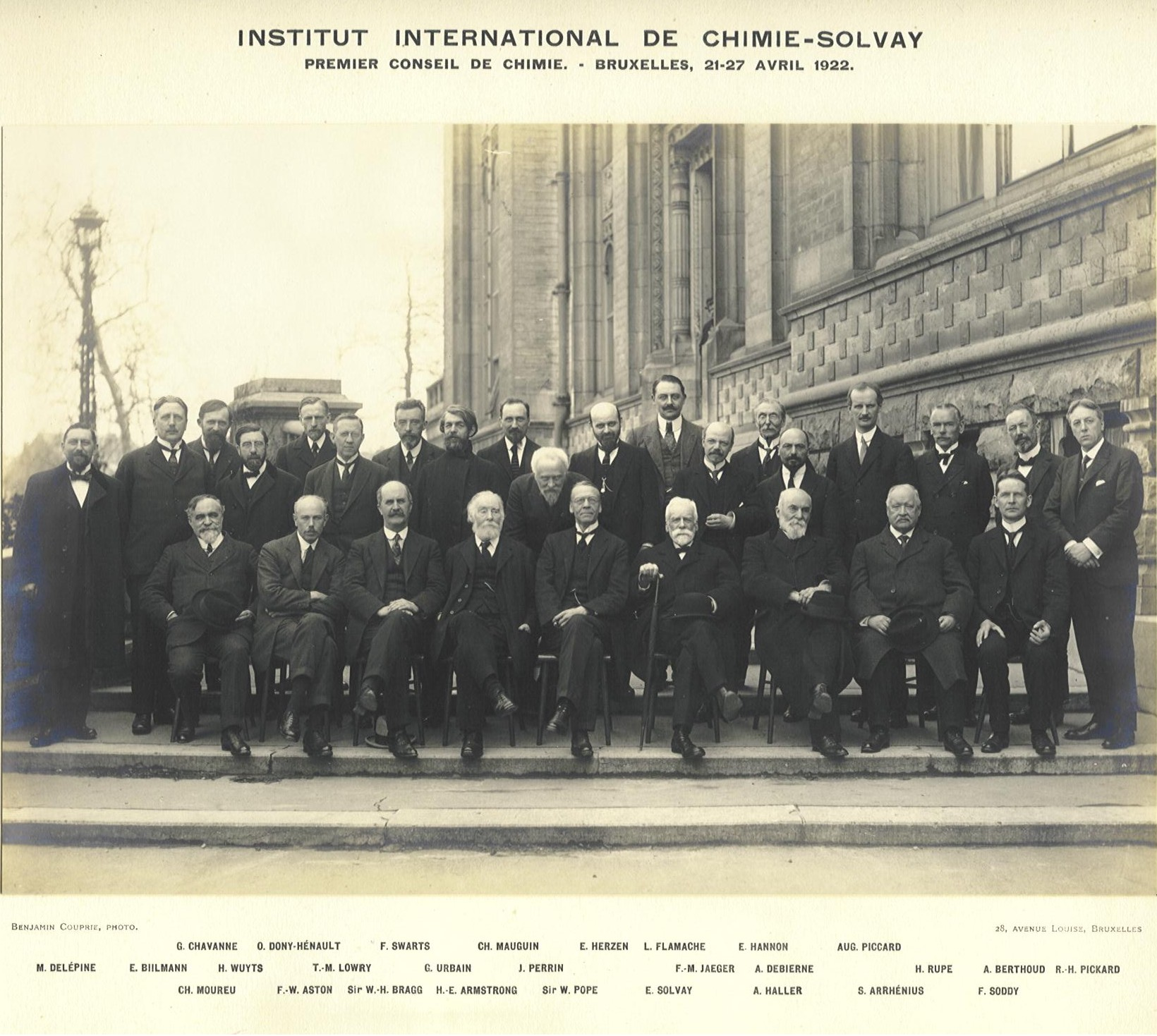
First Conference, 1922

== Solvay conferences on biology ==
No	Year	Title	Chair
1	2024	The organisation and dynamics of biological computation	Thomas Lecuit (IBDM Marseille)

== Participation of Nobel prize winners ==
The following Nobel prize-winning scientists either attended Solvay Conferences before 1934 or were recipients of a Solvay subsidy. (Before 1934 seven Solvay conferences on physics and four Solvay conferences on chemistry were held.)

1902–1910
H. A. Lorentz (1902), P. Zeeman (1902) - M. Skłodowska-Curie (1903 and 1911), S. Arrhenius (1903) - Lord Rayleigh (1904) - J. J. Thomson (1906) - A. A. Michelson (1907) - E. Rutherford (1908) - J. D. van der Waals (1910)

1911–1920
W. Wien (1911) - V. Grignard (1912) - H. Kamerlingh Onnes (1913) - M. von Laue (1914) - W. H. Bragg (1915), W. L. Bragg (1915) - C. G. Barkla (1917) - M. Planck (1918) - J. Stark (1919) - W. Nernst (1920)

1921–1930
A. Einstein (1921), F. Soddy (1921) - N. Bohr (1922), F. W. Aston (1922) - K. M. Siegbahn (1924) - J. Franck (1925), G. Hertz (1925) - J. Perrin (1926) - A. H. Compton (1927), C. T. R. Wilson (1927), H. Wieland (1927) - O. Richardson (1928) - L. de Broglie (1929)

1931–1940
W. Heisenberg (1932), I. Langmuir (1932) - P. A. M. Dirac (1933), E. Schrödinger (1933) - J. Chadwick (1935), F. Joliot-Curie (1935), I. Curie (1935) - W. Debije (1936) - E. Fermi (1938), R. Kuhn (1938) - E. Lawrence (1939), L. Ruzicka (1940)

1941–1950
G. de Hevesy (1943) - W. Pauli (1945) - P. Bridgman (1946) - P. Blackett (1948)

1951–1954
J. D. Cockcroft (1951), E. T. Walton (1951) - M. Born (1954), W. Bothe (1954).

== Archives ==
The archives of the Solvay conferences from 1910 to 1962 are kept at the Free University of Brussels and at École Supérieure de Physique et de Chimie Industrielles de la ville de Paris (ESPCI Paris). In 2023, these archives were added by UNESCO to its Memory of the World International Register, recognising them as globally important documentary heritage.

== See also ==
- List of physics conferences
