= Gerda Fassel =

Austrian sculptor (1941–2025)

- Born: 14 August 1941; Vienna, Germany
- Died: 6 May 2025 (aged 83); Vienna, Austria
- Education: University of Applied Arts Vienna
- Occupation: Sculptor

Gerda Fassel (14 August 1941 – 6 May 2025) was an Austrian sculptor.

== Biography ==
Born in Vienna on 14 August 1941, Fassel initially completed training in commercial design. From 1960 to 1961, she attended the Wiener Kunstschule before working in the hotel industry in the United States from 1962 to 1965. From 1965 to 1968, she studied sculpture at the Art Students League of New York under the tutelage of Jose de Creeft. She returned to Austria and studied at the University of Applied Arts Vienna from 1968 to 1972.

From 1996 to 1998, she returned to Die Angewandte as an invited professor before teaching sculpture full-time until 2006. She was succeeded by Alfred Hrdlicka. She primarily worked with bronze and sculpted female bodies, oftentimes with an unfinished look.

Fassel died in Vienna on 6 May 2025, at the age of 83.

== Expositions ==
- Philadelphia Civic Center Museum (1979)
- Biennale del Bronzetto e della Piccola Scultura (Padua, 1981)
- Museum für Moderne Kunst (Bolzano, 1991)
- Heiligenkreuzerhof (Vienna, 1993)

== Publications ==
- Texte zur bildenden Kunst (2011)

== Awards ==
- City of Vienna Prize for Fine Arts for Sculpture (1982)
- Austrian Decoration for Science and Art (2001)
- Gold Medal of the Order of Honour of Vienna (2015)
