= Kossel =

Kossel is a surname. Notable people with the surname include:

- Albrecht Kossel (1853–1927), German biochemist and Nobel laureate
- Walther Kossel (1888–1956), German physicist, son of Albrecht
