= Jagdish Mehra =

American physicist and historian of science

- Born: April 8, 1931; Meerut, United Provinces, British India
- Died: September 14, 2008 (aged 77); Sugar Land, Texas, U.S.
- Scientific career
- Thesis: The theory of London - van der Waals forces and certain features of the equation of state of gases (1963)

Jagdish Mehra (April 8, 1931 – September 14, 2008) was an Indian–American physicist and historian of science.

== Academic career ==
Mehra was educated at Allahabad University, the Max Planck Institut für Physik and the University of California at Los Angeles and obtained a Ph.D. in theoretical physics at the University of Neuchatel.

He subsequently taught at Purdue University, Southeastern Massachusetts University, the University of Geneva, the Solvay Institute in Brussels, Rice University, the University of Houston and the International Center for Theoretical Physics.

He is particularly well known for his 6-volume book The Historical Development of Quantum Theory, which he wrote with Helmut Rechenberg. He also wrote a biography of Richard Feynman, The Beat of a Different Drum: The Life and Science of Richard Feynman.

He also wrote a book on the controversy surrounding the exact role David Hilbert played in the development of the gravitation theory of Albert Einstein.

== Works ==
- Mehra, J. (Ed.). The Physicist's Conception of Nature. Dordrecht, Netherlands: Reidel, 1973. doi:10.1007/978-94-010-2602-4
- Mehra, J. (Ed.). Proceedings of the Symposium on the Development of the Physicist's Conception of Nature in the Twentieth Century (Trieste, Italy; Sept. 18–25, 1972).
- Mehra, J. Einstein, Hilbert and the Theory of Gravitation. Dordrecht, Netherlands: Reidel, 1974. doi:10.1007/978-94-010-2194-4
- Mehra, J. The Solvay Conferences on Physics. Aspects of the Development of Physics since 1911. Dordrecht, Netherlands: Reidel, 1975. doi:10.1007/978-94-010-1867-8
- Mehra, J. The Beat of a Different Drum: The Life and Science of Richard Feynman. Oxford, England: Clarendon Press, 1994. ISBN 978-0198518877
- Mehra, J. Einstein, Physics and Reality. World Scientific, 1999. doi:10.1142/4135
- Mehra, J. The Quantum Principle: Its Interpretation and Epistemology. doi:10.1007/978-94-010-2234-7
- Mehra, J. The Golden Age of Theoretical Physics: Selected Essays. July 2000. doi:10.1142/4454
- Mehra, J. and Milton, K. A. Climbing the Mountain: The Scientific Biography of Julian Schwinger. 2000. ISBN 978-0198527459
- Mehra, J. and Rechenberg, H. The Historical Development of Quantum Theory, Vol. 1: The Quantum Theory of Planck, Einstein, Bohr and Sommerfeld. Its Foundation and the Rise of Its Difficulties (1900-1925). New York: Springer-Verlag, 1982.
- Mehra, J. and Rechenberg, H. The Historical Development of Quantum Theory, Vol. 2: The Discovery of Quantum Mechanics, 1925. New York: Springer-Verlag, 1982.
- Mehra, J. and Rechenberg, H. The Historical Development of Quantum Theory, Vol. 3: The Formulation of Matrix Mechanics and Its Modifications 1925-1926. New York: Springer-Verlag, 1982.
- Mehra, J. and Rechenberg, H. The Historical Development of Quantum Theory, Vol. 4: The Fundamental Equations of Quantum Mechanics 1925-1926. The Reception of the New Quantum Mechanics. New York: Springer-Verlag, 1982.
- Mehra, J. and Rechenberg, H. The Historical Development of Quantum Theory, Vol. 5: Erwin Schrödinger and the Rise of Wave Mechanics. Part 1: Schrödinger in Vienna and Zurich 1887-1925. New York: Springer-Verlag, 1987.
- Mehra, J. and Rechenberg, H. The Historical Development of Quantum Theory, Vol. 5: Erwin Schrödinger and the Rise of Wave Mechanics. Part 2: The creation of Wave Mechanics, Early Response and Applications 1925-1926. New York: Springer-Verlag, 1987.
- Mehra, J. and Rechenberg, H. The Historical Development of Quantum Theory, Vol. 6: The Completion of Quantum Mechanics, 1926-1941, Part 1: The probabilistic Interpretation and the Empirical and Mathematical Foundation of Quantum Mechanics, 1926-1936. New York: Springer-Verlag, 2000.
- Mehra, J. and Rechenberg, H. The Historical Development of Quantum Theory, Vol. 6: The Completion of Quantum Mechanics, 1926-1941, Part 2: The Conceptual Completion of Quantum Mechanics. New York: Springer-Verlag, 2001.
- Mehra, J. and Wightman, A. S. (Eds.). The Collected Works of Eugene Paul Wigner (1902-1995), 8 vols. Berlin: Springer-Verlag, 1990-2000.

== Reviews ==
- Brush, Stephen G. (January 1, 1977). "Reviewed work: The Solvay Conferences on Physics: Aspects of the Development of Physics since 1911, Jagdish Mehra". American Scientist. 65 (1): 93–94. ISSN 0003-0996. JSTOR 27847655.
- Cushing, James T. (June 1, 1996). "Reviewed work: The Beat of a Different Drum: The Life and Science of Richard Feynman, Jagdish Mehra". Isis. 87 (2): 387–388. doi:10.1086/357555. ISSN 0021-1753. JSTOR 236135.
- Forman, Paul (September 1, 1975). "Reviewed work: The Physicist's Conception of Nature, Jagdish Mehra". Isis. 66 (3): 435–436. doi:10.1086/351508. ISSN 0021-1753. JSTOR 228876.
- Hendry, John (July 1, 1986). "Reviewed work: The Historical Development of Quantum Theory, Jagdish Mehra, Helmut Rechenberg; Constructing Quarks. A Sociological History of Particle Physics, Andrew Pickering". The British Journal for the History of Science. 19 (2): 206–208. doi:10.1017/S0007087400023001. ISSN 0007-0874. JSTOR 4026596.
- Hendry, John (September 1, 1988). "Reviewed work: The Historical Development of Quantum Theory. Volume 5. Erwin Schrödinger and the Rise of Wave Mechanics, Jagdish Mehra, Helmut Rechenberg". The British Journal for the History of Science. 21 (3): 371–372. doi:10.1017/S0007087400025139. ISSN 0007-0874. JSTOR 4026844.
- Kaiser, David (June 1, 2005). "Reviewed work: Climbing the Mountain: The Scientific Biography of Julian Schwinger, Jagdish Mehra, Kimball A. Milton". The British Journal for the History of Science. 38 (2): 239–240. doi:10.1017/s0007087405376965. ISSN 0007-0874. JSTOR 4028714. S2CID 145229344.
- McMullin, Ernan (September 1, 1978). "Reviewed work: The Solvay Conferences on Physics: Aspects of the Development of Physics since 1911, Jagdish Mehra". Isis. 69 (3): 476–477. doi:10.1086/352108. ISSN 0021-1753. JSTOR 231083.
- Voss, David F. (June 10, 1994). "Reviewed work: No Ordinary Genius. The Illustrated Richard Feynman., Christopher Sykes; the Beat of a Different Drum. The Life and Science of Richard Feynman., Jagdish Mehra". Science. New Series. 264 (5165): 1617. doi:10.1126/science.264.5165.1617. ISSN 0036-8075. JSTOR 2883885. PMID 17769610.
- Wessels, Linda (June 1, 1991). "Reviewed work: The Historical Development of Quantum Theory. Volume V: Erwin Schrödinger and the Rise of Wave Mechanics, Jagdish Mehra, Helmut Rechenberg". Isis. 82 (2): 404–405. doi:10.1086/355814. ISSN 0021-1753. JSTOR 234908.
- Ziman, John (May 1, 1975). "Reviewed work: The Physicist's Conception of Nature, Jagdish Mehra". American Scientist. 63 (3): 334. ISSN 0003-0996. JSTOR 27845471.
- Heilbron, J. L. (September 1, 1985). "Artes compilationis". Isis. 76 (3): 388–393. doi:10.1086/353892. ISSN 0021-1753. JSTOR 232871. S2CID 144541847.
- Taylor, John C. (January 1, 1997). "Feynman". Notes and Records of the Royal Society of London. 51 (1): 156–157. ISSN 0035-9149. JSTOR 532050.
- Brush, Stephen G. (September 1, 1995). "Feynman's Success: Demystifying Quantum Mechanics". American Scientist. 83 (5): 476–477. ISSN 0003-0996. JSTOR 29775527.
- Dyson, Freeman (September 27, 1974). "Honoring Dirac". Science. New Series. 185 (4157): 1160–1161. doi:10.1126/science.185.4157.1158. ISSN 0036-8075. JSTOR 1738373.
