= Helmut Rechenberg =

German physicist and science historian

Helmut Rechenberg (6 November 1937, Berlin – 10 November 2016, Munich) was a German physicist and science historian.

== Biography ==
=== Education ===
Rechenberg studied mathematics, physics and astronomy at LMU Munich and graduated in 1964. At LMU Munich, his work was in experimental physics, studying the magnetism of solids. He moved to the Max Planck Institute for Physics in Munich, where he became Werner Heisenberg's doctoral student. In 1968, he graduated with a doctorate on quantum field theory.

=== Career ===
From 1970 to 1972, he worked at the University of Texas at Austin, collaborating with George Sudarshan on quantum field theory and with Jagdish Mehra on science history. He then returned to Germany and the Max Planck Institute, from which he officially retired in 2002.

His six-volume work with Jagdish Mehra on the history of quantum mechanics has been described as "an extraordinary amount of painstaking scholarship". Rechenberg also co-edited Werner Heisenberg's collected works and from 1977 headed the MPI's Werner Heisenberg Archive. After retiring, he wrote a two-volume biography of Heisenberg.

From 1991 to 2006, he was also a board member of the Deutsche Physikalische Gesellschaft's Physics History Association.
