= List of things named after Johannes Rydberg =

Janne Rydberg was a Swedish spectroscopist and physicist, whom the following are named after:

- Rydberg constant
  - Rydberg, a unit of energy, derived from the Rydberg constant, equal to half the Hartree energy
- Rydberg correction
- Rydberg formula
- Rydberg ionization spectroscopy
- Rydberg state
  - Heavy Rydberg system
  - Rydberg atom
  - Rydberg matter
  - Rydberg molecule
  - Rydberg polaron
- Rydberg–Klein–Rees method
- Rydberg–Ritz combination principle

== Others ==
- Mendel-Rydberg Basin
- Rydberg (crater)
