= Rydberg =

Rydberg may refer to:

== People ==
- Gerda Rydberg (1858–1928), Swedish artist better known as Gerda Tirén
- Jan Rydberg, (1923-2015), Swedish chemist who worked on nuclear chemistry and recycling at Chalmers University of Technology
- Johannes Rydberg (1854–1919), Swedish physicist and deviser of the Rydberg formula
- Kaisu-Mirjami Rydberg (1905–1959), Finnish journalist and politician
- Per Axel Rydberg (1860–1931), Swedish-American botanist
- Sam Rydberg (1885–1956), Swedish composer
- Viktor Rydberg (1828–1895), Swedish author, poet, and mythographer
- Viktor Crus Rydberg (1995—), Swedish ice hockey player

== Physics ==
- Rydberg constant, a constant related to atomic spectra
- Rydberg formula, a formula describing wavelengths
- Rydberg atom, an excited atomic state
- Rydberg molecule, an electronically excited chemical substance
- Rydberg unit of energy (symbol Ry), derived from the Rydberg constant

== Places ==
- Rydberg (crater), a lunar crater named after Johannes Rydberg
