= Rydberg molecule =

A Rydberg molecule is an electronically excited chemical species. Electronically excited molecular states are generally quite different in character from electronically excited atomic states. However, particularly for highly electronically excited molecular systems, the ionic core interaction with an excited electron can take on the general aspects of the interaction between the proton and the electron in the hydrogen atom. The spectroscopic assignment of these states follows the Rydberg formula, named after the Swedish physicist Johannes Rydberg, and they are called Rydberg states of molecules. Rydberg series are associated with partially removing an electron from the ionic core.

Each Rydberg series of energies converges on an ionization energy threshold associated with a particular ionic core configuration. These quantized Rydberg energy levels can be associated with the quasiclassical Bohr atomic picture. The closer you get to the ionization threshold energy, the higher the principal quantum number, and the smaller the energy difference between near threshold Rydberg states. As the electron is promoted to higher energy levels in a Rydberg series, the spatial excursion of the electron from the ionic core increases and the system is more like the Bohr quasiclassical picture.

The Rydberg states of molecules with low principal quantum numbers can interact with the other excited electronic states of the molecule. This can cause shifts in energy. The assignment of molecular Rydberg states often involves following a Rydberg series from intermediate to high principal quantum numbers. The energy of Rydberg states can be refined by including a correction called the quantum defect in the Rydberg formula. The quantum defect correction can be associated with the presence of a distributed ionic core.

The experimental study of molecular Rydberg states has been conducted with traditional methods for generations. However, the development of laser-based techniques such as Resonance Ionization Spectroscopy has allowed relatively easy access to these Rydberg molecules as intermediates. This is particularly true for Resonance Enhanced Multiphoton Ionization (REMPI) spectroscopy, since multiphoton processes involve different selection rules from single photon processes. The study of high principal quantum number Rydberg states has spawned a number of spectroscopic techniques. These "near threshold Rydberg states" can have long lifetimes, particularly for the higher orbital angular momentum states that do not interact strongly with the ionic core. Rydberg molecules can condense to form clusters of Rydberg matter which has an extended lifetime against de-excitation.

Dihelium (He_{2}^{*}) was the first known Rydberg molecule.

== Other types ==
In 2009, a different kind of Rydberg molecule was finally created by researchers from the University of Stuttgart. There, the interaction between a Rydberg atom and a ground state atom leads to a novel bond type. Two rubidium atoms were used to create the molecule which survived for 18 microseconds.

In 2015, a 'trilobite' Rydberg molecule was observed by researchers from the University of Oklahoma. This molecule was theorized in 2000 and is characterized by an electron density distribution that resembles the shape of a trilobite when plotted in cylindrical coordinates. These molecules have lifetimes of tens of microseconds and electric dipole moments of up to 2000 Debye.

In 2016, a butterfly Rydberg molecule was observed by a collaboration involving researchers from the Kaiserslautern University of Technology and Purdue University. A butterfly Rydberg molecule is a weak pairing of a Rydberg atom and a ground state atom that is enhanced by the presence of a shape resonance in the scattering between the Rydberg electron and the ground state atom. This new kind of atomic bond was theorized in 2002 and is characterized by an electron density distribution that resembles the shape of a butterfly. As a consequence of the unconventional binding mechanism, butterfly Rydberg molecules show peculiar properties such as multiple vibrational ground states at different bond lengths and giant dipole moments in excess of 500 debye.

== See also ==
- Rydberg atom
- Rydberg matter
