= Interatomic Coulombic decay =

Typical Process of Interatomic Coulombic Decay

Interatomic Coulombic decay (ICD) is a general, fundamental property of atoms and molecules that have neighbors. Interatomic (intermolecular) Coulombic decay is a very efficient interatomic (intermolecular) relaxation process of an electronically excited atom or molecule embedded in an environment. Without the environment the process cannot take place. Until now it has been mainly demonstrated for atomic and molecular clusters, independently of whether they are of van-der-Waals or hydrogen bonded type.

The nature of the process can be depicted as follows: Consider a cluster with two subunits, A and B. Suppose an inner-valence electron is removed from subunit A. If the resulting (ionized) state is higher in energy than the double ionization threshold of subunit A then an intraatomic (intramolecular) process (autoionization, in the case of core ionization Auger decay) sets in. Even though the excitation is energetically not higher than the double ionization threshold of subunit A itself, it may be higher than the double ionization threshold of the cluster which is lowered due to charge separation. If this is the case, an interatomic (intermolecular) process sets in which is called ICD. During the ICD the excess energy of subunit A is used to remove (due to electronic correlation) an outer-valence electron from subunit B. As a result, a doubly ionized cluster is formed with a single positive charge on A and B. Thus, charge separation in the final state is a fingerprint of ICD. As a consequence of the charge separation the cluster typically breaks apart via Coulomb explosion.

ICD is characterized by its decay rate or the lifetime of the excited state. The decay rate depends on the interatomic (intermolecular) distance of A and B and its dependence allows to draw conclusions on the mechanism of ICD. Particularly important is the determination of the kinetic energy spectrum of the electron emitted from subunit B which is denoted as ICD electron. ICD electrons are often measured in ICD experiments. Typically, ICD takes place on the femto second time scale, many orders of magnitude faster than those of the competing photon emission and other relaxation processes.

== ICD in water ==
Very recently, ICD has been identified to be an additional source of low energy electrons in water and water clusters. There, ICD is faster than the competing proton transfer that is usually the prominent pathway in the case of electronic excitation of water clusters. The response of condensed water to electronic excitations is of utmost importance for biological systems. For instance, it was shown in experiments that low energy electrons do affect constituents of DNA effectively. Furthermore, ICD was reported after core-electron excitations of hydroxide in dissolved water.

== Related processes ==
Interatomic (Intermolecular) processes do not only occur after ionization as described above. Independent of what kind of electronic excitation is at hand, an interatomic (intermolecular) process can set in if an atom or molecule is in a state energetically higher than the ionization threshold of other atoms or molecules in the neighborhood. The following ICD related processes, which were for convenience considered below for clusters, are known:

- Resonant Interatomic Coulombic Deacy (RICD) was first validated experimentally. This process emanates from an inner-valence excitation where an inner-valence electron is promoted to a virtual orbital. During the process the vacant inner-valence spot is filled up by an outer-valence electron of the same subunit or by the electron in the virtual orbital. The following action is referred to as RICD if in the previous process generated excess energy removes an outer-valence electron from another cluster constituent. The excess energy can, on the other hand, also be used to remove an outer-valence electron from the same subunit (autoionization). Consequently, RICD competes not only with slow radiative decay as ICD, it competes also with the effective autoionization. Both experimental and theoretical evidence show that this competition does not lead to a suppression of the RICD.
- Auger-ICD cascade has been first predicted theoretically. States with a vacancy in a core-shell usually undergo Auger decay. This decay often produces double ionized states which can sometimes decay by another Auger decay forming a so-called Auger cascade. However, often the double ionized state is not high enough in energy to decay intraatomically once more. Under such conditions, formation of a decay cascade is impossible in the isolated species, but can occur in clusters with the next step being ICD. Meanwhile, the Auger-ICD cascade has been confirmed and studied experimentally.
- Excitation–transfer–ionization (ETI) is a non-radiative decay pathway of outer-valence excitations in an environment. Assume that an outer-valence electron of a cluster subunit is promoted to a virtual orbital. On the isolated species this excitation can usually only decay slowly by photon emission. In the cluster there is an additional, much more efficient pathway if the ionization threshold of another cluster constituent is lower than the excitation energy. Then the excess energy of the excitation is transferred interatomically (intermolecularly) to remove an outer-valence electron from another cluster subunit with an ionization threshold lower than the excitation energy. Usually, this interatomic (intermolecular) process also takes place within a few femtoseconds.
- Electron-transfer-mediated decay (ETMD) is a non-radiative decay pathway where a vacancy in an atom or molecule is filled by an electron from a neighboring species; a secondary electron is emitted either by the first atom/molecule or by the neighboring species. The existence of this decay mechanism has been proven experimentally in Argon dimers and in mixed Argon – Krypton clusters.
