= Heavy Rydberg system =

A heavy Rydberg system consists of a weakly bound positive and negative ion orbiting their common centre of mass. Such systems share many properties with the conventional Rydberg atom and consequently are sometimes referred to as heavy Rydberg atoms. While such a system is a type of ionically bound molecule, it should not be confused with a molecular Rydberg state, which is simply a molecule with one or more highly excited electrons.

The peculiar properties of the Rydberg atom come from the large charge separation and the resulting hydrogenic potential. The extremely large separation between the two components of a heavy Rydberg system results in an almost perfect 1/r hydrogenic potential seen by each ion. The positive ion can be viewed as analogous to the nucleus of a hydrogen atom, with the negative ion playing the role of the electron.

== Species ==
The most commonly studied system to date is the H^{+}/H^{−} system, consisting of a proton bound with a H^{−} ion. The H^{+}/H^{−} system was first observed in 2000 by a group at the University of Waterloo in Canada.

The formation of the H^{−} ion can be understood classically; as the single electron in a hydrogen atom cannot fully shield the positively charged nucleus, another electron brought into close proximity will feel an attractive force. While this classical description is nice for getting a feel for the interactions involved, it is an oversimplification; many other atoms have a greater electron affinity than hydrogen. In general the process of forming a negative ion is driven by the filling of atomic electron shells to form a lower energy configuration.

Only a small number of molecules have been used to produce heavy Rydberg systems although in principle any atom with a positive electron affinity can bind with a positive ion. Species used include O_{2}, H_{2}S and HF. Fluorine and oxygen are particularly favoured due to their high electron affinity, high ionisation energy and consequently high electronegativity.

== Production ==
The difficulty in the production of heavy Rydberg systems arises in finding an energetic pathway by which a molecule can be excited with just the right energy to form an ion pair, without sufficient internal energy to cause autodissociation (a process analogous to autoionization in atoms) or rapid dissociation due to collisions or local fields.

Currently production of heavy Rydberg systems relies on complex vacuum ultra-violet (so called because it is strongly absorbed in air and requires the entire system to be enclosed within a vacuum chamber) or multi-photon transitions (relying on absorption of multiple photons almost simultaneously), both of which are rather inefficient and result in systems with high internal energy.

== Features ==
The bond length in a heavy Rydberg system is 10,000 times larger than in a typical diatomic molecule. As well as producing the characteristic hydrogen-like behaviour, this also makes them extremely sensitive to perturbation by external electric and magnetic fields.

Heavy Rydberg systems have a relatively large reduced mass, given by:

$$\mu = {m_1m_2 \over m_1+m_2}$$

This leads to a very slow time evolution, which makes them easy to manipulate both spatially and energetically, while their low binding energy makes them relatively simple to detect through field dissociation and detection of the resulting ions, in a process known as threshold ion-pair production spectroscopy.

Kepler's third law states that the period of an orbit is proportional to the cube of the semi-major axis; this can be applied to the Coulomb force:

$$\tau^2 = {4\pi^2\mu \over kZe^2}a^3$$

where $\tau$ is the time-period, $\mu$ is the reduced mass, $a$ is the semi-major axis and $k = 1/(4\pi\epsilon_0)$.

Classically we can say that a system with a large reduced mass has a long orbital period. Quantum mechanically, a large reduced mass in a system leads to narrow spacing of the energy levels and the rate of time-evolution of the wavefunction depends on this energy spacing. This slow time-evolution makes heavy Rydberg systems ideal for experimentally probing the dynamics of quantum systems.
