= John H. Hubbell =

John Howard Hubbell (1925 – March 31, 2007) was an American radiation physicist born in Ann Arbor, Michigan. He was on the staff of the National Institute of Standards and Technology (NIST) (formerly National Bureau of Standards) from 1950 until 1988, when he retired. He remained a contractor to NIST until he died in 2007. He was a founder and past president of the International Radiation Physics Society.

He earned a BSE in engineering physics in 1949 and an MS in physics in 1950 from the University of Michigan.

He was the author or co-author of over one hundred publications including the "Radiation Physics" article in the 2002 Encyclopedia of Physical Science and Technology. He was the past editor of Applied Radiation and Isotopes and consulting editor of Radiation Physics and Chemistry.

In the scientific community, Mr. Hubbell is known for his evaluations, computations and compilations of photon cross sections and attenuation (and energy-absorption) coefficients used in medicine, engineering and other disciplines. He is also known for his computationally tractable solutions of problems associated with the predictions of radiation fields.

== Awards and honors ==
- Faculty Medal, Czech Technical University, 1982
- Radiation Industry Award, American Nuclear Society, 1985
- Honorary Academician of the International Higher Education Academy of Sciences (Moscow) 1994
- Outstanding Alumnus Award, Dept. of Nuclear Engineering, University of Michigan, 1995
- Doctor honoris causa, Universidad Nacional de Córdoba, 1996
- Elected Fellow of the American Physical Society, 2002.

== Publications ==
- Hubbell, J.H. (1969). Photon cross sections, attenuation coefficients, and energy absorption coefficients from 10 keV to 100 GeV. Washington: U.S. National Bureau of Standards. LCCN 73600412.
- Hubbell, J.H.; L. V. Spencer (1964). Shielding against gamma rays, neutrons, and electrons from nuclear weapons: a review and bibliography. Washington: U.S. Dept. of Commerce, National Bureau of Standards. LCCN 63060082.
