= Jan Rydberg =

Swedish academic

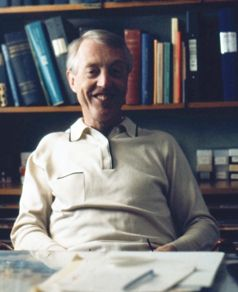
Jan Rydberg in 1973

Jan Rydberg (1923–2015) was a Swedish academic who spent much of his working life at Chalmers University of Technology. He was known for his work on solvent extraction which he did while working in the Nuclear Chemistry section at Chalmers.

== Education ==
He obtained his masters (MS) in Stockholm in chemistry, physics, mathematics and psychology in 1947. The topic of his thesis was "Studies of complex formation by means of a liquid-liquid distribution method." and this was defended in Stockholm in 1955, this was a thesis on the Solvent Extraction of metals using acetylacetone. His first scientific paper was on the subject of the complexes formed from thorium and acetylacetonate anions. This work was done using short-lived radioactive thorium-234 obtained from uranium-238. At the solvent extraction conference (ISEC 2008) was awarded the “Carl Hanson Award” for his outstanding contribution to solvent extraction. He was one of the founding editors of the journal Solvent Extraction and Ion Exchange, which is known as SXIX.

== Career ==
He was an early worker in partitionering and transmutation, an alternative concept to the long term deep geological disposal of either used fuel or high level waste. In P&T the alpha emitters which are the main contributors to the radiotoxicity of the waste (beyond 300 years) are removed from the liquid waste. These alpha emitters (transuranium actinides) are then destroyed (transmuted) by nuclear reactions.

In 1962 he was appointed professor of nuclear chemistry at Chalmers University of Technology in 1962, and he held this chair until 1988. While at Chalmers he developed the AKUFVE experimental rig which consists of two centrifugal machines coupled together. The work on the AKUFVE resulted in the development of the SISAK experimental equipment which is used to study very short-lived radionuclides. The SISAK equipment has been used to conduct research on the chemistry of superheavy elements. In recent years it has been used to study the chemistry of the transactinides.

The AKUFVE was also used by Michael Cox to study metal extraction at Warren Spring Laboratory (WSL) in Stevenage while working with Douglas Flett. The same type of experimental rig was used by Flett before to study the extraction of copper using the β hydroxybenzophenone oxime (LIX65N) with and without the addition of LIX63. Also in recent times some workers in China are also using the AKUFVE rig to study the rare earths

He took part in the debate regarding the question of "should the use of nuclear power be increased or discontinued", this included an exchange of ideas which were published in the Bulletin of the Atomic Scientists. Pro-nuclear Rydberg debated with Dean Abrahamson, Wendy Barnaby, Thomas B. Johansson and Peter Steen within the pages of the bulletin. Rydberg's rebuttal discusses how slowly glass, lead and copper corrode. Abrahamson et al. reply in the same issue on page 61. Rydberg also has written a review on the risks from nuclear waste which was published by SKI (Report 96:70). SKI has now become part of SSM which is the Swedish Radiation Protection Board.

Rydberg in later life was involved in the writing of two textbooks, one of which was Radiochemistry and Nuclear Chemistry (Gregory R. Choppin, Jan-Olov Liljenzin and Jan Rydberg, published in 1995). This was reviewed in Applied Radiation and Isotopes by David M. Taylor.

== Personal life and death ==
He was married to Britta E. Winroth on the 25th of October 1923, they had three daughters (Christina, Ingrid and Gunilla). He died in 2015 of heart failure but he had lived for years with prostate cancer. After his death, a recycling prize at Chalmers was named after him.

== Awards and honors ==
- Commander of the Order of the Polar Star
- Membership of the Royal Swedish Academy of Engineering Sciences
- Membership of the Royal Society of Arts and Sciences in Gothenburg
- The Carl Hanson Medal

== Positions held ==
- Chairman of the Swedish Chemical Society
- Dean of Chemistry at CTH, Gothenburg (1980–1982).
- Director of MEAB (1970–1981), MEAB is a company which markets solvent extraction machines for industrial and research use.
