= Inglis–Teller equation =

The Inglis–Teller equation represents an approximate relationship between the plasma density and the principal quantum number of the highest bound state of an atom. The equation was derived by David R. Inglis and Edward Teller in 1939.

In a plasma, atomic levels are broadened and shifted due to the Stark effect, caused by electric microfields formed by the charged plasma particles (ions and electrons). The Stark broadening increases with the principal quantum number $n$, while the energy separation between the nearby levels $n$ and $(n + 1)$ decreases. Therefore, above a certain $n$ all levels become merged.

Assuming a neutral atomic radiator in a plasma consisting of singly charged ions (and neglecting the electrons), the equation reads

$$N n^{15/2} = 0.027 a_0^{-3}\,,$$

where $N$ is the ion particle density and $a_0$ is the Bohr radius. The equation readily generalizes to cases of multiply charged plasma ions and/or charged radiator. Allowance for the effect of electrons is also possible, as was discussed already in the original study.

Spectroscopically, this phenomenon appears as discrete spectral lines merging into continuous spectrum. Therefore, by using the (appropriately generalized) Inglis–Teller equation it is possible to infer the density of laboratory and astrophysical plasmas.
