= Rydberg state =

Excited quantum states with the convenient Rydberg energy formula

The Rydberg states of an atom or molecule are electronically excited states with energies that follow the Rydberg formula as they converge on an ionic state with an ionization energy. Although the Rydberg formula was developed to describe atomic energy levels, it has been used to describe many other systems that have electronic structure roughly similar to atomic hydrogen. In general, at sufficiently high principal quantum numbers, an excited electron-ionic core system will have the general character of a hydrogenic system (such as a Rydberg atom) and the energy levels will follow the Rydberg formula. Rydberg states have energies converging on the energy of the ion. The ionization energy threshold is the energy required to completely liberate an electron from the ionic core of an atom or molecule. In practice, a Rydberg wave packet is created by a laser pulse on a hydrogenic atom and thus populates a superposition of Rydberg states. Modern investigations using pump-probe experiments show molecular pathways – e.g. dissociation of (NO)_{2} – via these special states.

== Rydberg series ==
Rydberg series describe the energy levels associated with partially removing an electron from the ionic core. Each Rydberg series converges on an ionization energy threshold associated with a particular ionic core configuration. These quantized Rydberg energy levels can be associated with the quasiclassical Bohr atomic picture. The closer you get to the ionization threshold energy, the higher the principal quantum number, and the smaller the energy difference between "near threshold Rydberg states." As the electron is promoted to higher energy levels, the spatial excursion of the electron from the ionic core increases and the system is more like the Bohr quasiclassical picture.

== Energy of Rydberg states ==
The energy of Rydberg states can be refined by including a correction called the quantum defect in the Rydberg formula. The "quantum defect" correction is associated with the presence of a distributed ionic core. Even for many electronically excited molecular systems, the ionic core interaction with an excited electron can take on the general aspects of the interaction between the proton and the electron in the hydrogen atom. The spectroscopic assignment of these states follows the Rydberg formula and they are called Rydberg states of molecules.

== Molecular Rydberg states ==
Wave functions of high Rydberg states are highly diffuse, with spatial dimensions that scale with the square of the principal quantum number n^{2}, becoming vastly larger than the molecular core.” As a result, any isolated neutral molecule behaves like a hydrogen-like atom at the Rydberg limit. For molecules with multiple stable monovalent cations, multiple Rydberg series may exist. Because of the complexity of molecular spectra, low-lying Rydberg states of molecules are often mixed with valence states with similar energy and are thus not pure Rydberg states.

== See also ==
- Rydberg atom
- Rydberg matter
- Orbital state
