= Autoionization =

Autoionization is a process by which an atom or a molecule in an excited state spontaneously emits one of the outer-shell electrons, thus going from a state with charge Z to a state with charge Z + 1, for example from an electrically neutral state to a singly ionized state.

Autoionizing states are usually short-lived, and thus can be described as Fano resonances rather than normal bound states. They can be observed as variations in the ionization cross sections of atoms and molecules, by photoionization, electron ionization and other methods.

== Examples ==
As examples, several Fano resonances in the extreme ultraviolet photoionization spectrum of neon are attributed to autoionizing states. Some are due to one-electron excitations, such as a series of three strong similarly shaped peaks at energies of 45.546, 47.121 and 47.692 eV which are interpreted as 1s^{2} 2s^{1} 2p^{6} np (^{1}P) states for n = 3, 4 and 5. These states of neutral neon lie beyond the first ionization energy because it takes more energy to excite a 2s electron than to remove a 2p electron. When autoionization occurs, the np → 2s de-excitation provides the energy needed to remove one 2p electron and form the Ne^{+} ground state.

Other resonances are attributed to two-electron excitations. The same neon photoionization spectrum considered above contains a fourth strong resonance in the same region at 44.979 eV but with a very different shape, which is interpreted as the 1s^{2} 2s^{2} 2p^{4} 3s 3p (^{1}P) state. For autoionization, the 3s → 2p transition provides the energy to remove the 3p electron.

Electron ionization allows the observation of some states which cannot be excited by photons due to selection rules. In neon for example again, the excitation of triplet states is forbidden by the spin selection rule ΔS = 0, but the 1s^{2} 2s^{2} 2p^{4} 3s 3p (^{3}P) has been observed by electron ionization at 42.04 eV. Ion impact by high energy H^{+}, He^{+} and Ne^{+} ions has also been used.

If a core electron is missing, a positive ion can autoionize further and lose a second electron in the Auger effect. In neon, X-ray excitation can remove a 1s electron, producing an excited Ne^{+} ion with configuration 1s^{1} 2s^{2} 2p^{6}. In the subsequent Auger process a 2s → 1s transition and simultaneous emission of a second electron from 2p leads to the Ne^{2+} 1s^{2} 2s^{1} 2p^{5} ionic state.

Molecules, in addition, can have vibrationally autoionizing Rydberg states, in which the small amount of energy necessary to ionize a Rydberg state is provided by vibrational excitation.

== Autodetachment ==
When the excited state of the atom or molecule consists of a compound state of a neutral particle and a resonantly attached electron, autoionization is referred to as autodetachment. In this case the compound state begins with a net negative charge before the autoionization process, and ends with a neutral charge. The ending state will often be vibrationally or rotationally excited state as a result of excess energy from the resonant attachment process.
