= Charles Rugeley Bury =

English physical chemist

Charles Rugeley Bury (29 June 1890 – 30 December 1968) was an English physical chemist who proposed an early model of the atom with the arrangement of electrons, which explained their chemical properties, alongside the more dominant model of Niels Bohr. In some early papers, the model was called the "Bohr-Bury Atom". He introduced the word transition to describe the elements now known as transition metals or transition elements.

Bury was born in Henley-on-Thames and grew up in Ellfield, Wotton-under-Edge. His father had studied law but did not continue in the field and died when he was young. A grandmother in Leamington took care of him and his early education was at Malvern College. He then went to Trinity College, Oxford where D.H. Nagel was a tutor. His chemistry teachers included Harold Hartley. Bury worked as a demonstrator in Balliol and Trinity College labs. In 1912 he went to Göttingen and worked with Walther Nernst. He then joined the chemistry department at the University College of Wales, Aberystwyth in 1913 and volunteered with the Gloucestershire Regiment in 1914. He saw action in Mesopotamia and returned in 1919.

In 1921 Bury proposed a model of the atom which suggested that electrons were distributed symmetrically over the surface of concentric spheres which could hold 2, 8, 18, and 32 electrons. He proposed that an outer layer of electrons can contain a maximum of 8 electrons (s^{2}p^{6} in modern notation), and that for inner layers there occurs a transition series of elements during the change from 8 to 18 (or 18 to 32) electrons. This was the first use of the word transition in the context of electron configurations.

In July 1943, Bury moved to the Imperial Chemical Industries to work with colleague M.P. Appleby and retired from there in 1952. His other works were on the chemistry of colour, freezing points, and on micelles.

He married Margaret Adams in 1922 and they had a son and a daughter.
