= Jan-Olov Liljenzin =

Swedish chemist and professor (1936–2019)

Jan-Olov Liljenzin (1936-2019) was a Swedish chemist and professor in nuclear chemistry.

Liljenzin was professor at University of Oslo, Nuclear Chemistry, Norway 1986-1989, and at Chalmers University of Technology, Nuclear Chemistry, Gothenburg, Sweden, between 1989 and 2001.

Liljenzin made early contributions to the understanding of the influence of chemistry on core melt accidents and participated in international research about iodine chemistry and how to mitigate radioactive releases from nuclear accidents. He also investigated various methods of treatment and separation of spent radioactive fuel as well as chemical aspects of final repository for radioactive waste.

Liljenzin was a co-author to Radiochemistry and nuclear chemistry which 2013 was issued in its 4:th edition. He was a co-author to a number of scientific papers about nuclear chemistry with applications to separation of nuclear waste and chemical processes during severe nuclear accidents. His publications has (2026) more than 2 000 citations and a h-index of 25.
