= Electron shell =

Principal energy levels in atomic physics

In chemistry and atomic physics, an electron shell may be thought of as an orbit that electrons follow around an atom's nucleus. The closest shell to the nucleus is called the "1 shell" (also called the "K shell"), followed by the "2 shell" (or "L shell"), then the "3 shell" (or "M shell"), and so on further and further from the nucleus. The shells correspond to the principal quantum numbers (n = 1, 2, 3, 4 ...) or are labeled alphabetically with the letters used in X-ray notation (K, L, M, ...). Each period on the conventional periodic table of elements represents an electron shell.

Each shell can contain only a fixed number of electrons: the first shell can hold up to two electrons, the second shell can hold up to eight electrons, the third shell can hold up to 18, continuing as the general formula of the nth shell being able to hold up to 2(n^{2}) electrons. For an explanation of why electrons exist in these shells, see electron configuration.

Each shell consists of one or more subshells, and each subshell consists of one or more atomic orbitals.

== History ==
In 1913, Niels Bohr proposed a model of the atom, giving the arrangement of electrons in their sequential orbits. At that time, Bohr allowed the capacity of the inner orbit of the atom to increase to eight electrons as the atoms got larger, and "in the scheme given below the number of electrons in this [outer] ring is arbitrary put equal to the normal valency of the corresponding element". Using these and other constraints, he proposed configurations that are in accord with those now known only for the first six elements. "From the above we are led to the following possible scheme for the arrangement of the electrons in light atoms:"

Bohr's 1913 proposed configurations
Element	Electrons per shell	Element	Electrons per shell	Element	Electrons per shell
1	1	9	4, 4, 1	17	8, 4, 4, 1
2	2	10	8, 2	18	8, 8, 2
3	2, 1	11	8, 2, 1	19	8, 8, 2, 1
4	2, 2	12	8, 2, 2	20	8, 8, 2, 2
5	2, 3	13	8, 2, 3	21	8, 8, 2, 3
6	2, 4	14	8, 2, 4	22	8, 8, 2, 4
7	4, 3	15	8, 4, 3	23	8, 8, 4, 3
8	4, 2, 2	16	8, 4, 2, 2	24	8, 8, 4, 2, 2

The shell terminology comes from Arnold Sommerfeld's modification of the 1913 Bohr model. During this period Bohr was working with Walther Kossel, whose papers in 1914 and in 1916 called the orbits "shells". Sommerfeld retained Bohr's planetary model, but added mildly elliptical orbits (characterized by additional quantum numbers ℓ and m) to explain the fine spectroscopic structure of some elements. The multiple electrons with the same principal quantum number (n) had close orbits that formed a "shell" of positive thickness instead of the circular orbit of Bohr's model which orbits called "rings" were described by a plane.

The existence of electron shells was first observed experimentally in Charles Barkla's and Henry Moseley's X-ray absorption studies. Moseley's work did not directly concern the study of electron shells, because he was trying to prove that the periodic table was not arranged by weight, but by the charge of the protons in the nucleus. However, because the number of electrons in an electrically neutral atom equals the number of protons, this work was extremely important to Niels Bohr who mentioned Moseley's work several times in his 1962 interview. Moseley was part of Rutherford's group, as was Niels Bohr. Moseley measured the frequencies of X-rays emitted by every element between calcium and zinc and found that the frequencies became greater as the elements got heavier. This led to the theory that electrons were emitting X-rays when they were shifted to lower shells. This led to the conclusion that the electrons were in Kossel's shells with a definite limit per shell, labeling them with the letters K, L, M, N, O, P, and Q. The origin of this terminology was alphabetic. Barkla, who worked independently from Moseley as an X-ray spectrometry experimentalist, first noticed two distinct types of scattering from shooting X-rays at elements in 1909 and named them "A" and "B". Barkla described these two types of X-ray diffraction: the first was unconnected with the type of material used in the experiment and could be polarized. The second diffraction beam he called "fluorescent" because it depended on the irradiated material. It was not known what these lines meant at the time, but in 1911 Barkla decided there might be scattering lines previous to "A", so he began at "K". However, later experiments indicated that the K absorption lines are produced by the innermost electrons. These letters were later found to correspond to the n values 1, 2, 3, etc. that were used in the Bohr model. They are used in the spectroscopic Siegbahn notation.

The work of assigning electrons to shells was continued from 1913 to 1925 by many chemists and a few physicists. Niels Bohr was one of the few physicists who followed the chemist's work of defining the periodic table, while Arnold Sommerfeld worked more on trying to make a relativistic working model of the atom that would explain the fine structure of the spectra from a classical orbital physics standpoint through the Atombau approach. Einstein and Rutherford, who did not follow chemistry, were unaware of the chemists who were developing electron shell theories of the periodic table from a chemistry point of view, such as Irving Langmuir, Charles Bury, J.J. Thomson, and Gilbert Lewis, who all introduced corrections to Bohr's model such as a maximum of two electrons in the first shell, eight in the next and so on, and were responsible for explaining valency in the outer electron shells, and the building up of atoms by adding electrons to the outer shells. So when Bohr outlined his electron shell atomic theory in 1922, there was no mathematical formula for the theory. So Rutherford said he was hard put "to form an idea of how you arrive at your conclusions". Einstein said of Bohr's 1922 paper that his "electron-shells of the atoms together with their significance for chemistry appeared to me like a miracle – and appears to me as a miracle even today". Arnold Sommerfeld, who had followed the Atombau structure of electrons instead of Bohr who was familiar with the chemists' views of electron structure, spoke of Bohr's 1921 lecture and 1922 article on the shell model as "the greatest advance in atomic structure since 1913". However, the electron shell development of Niels Bohr was basically the same theory as that of the chemist Charles Rugeley Bury in his 1921 paper.

As work continued on the electron shell structure of the Sommerfeld-Bohr Model, Sommerfeld had introduced three "quantum numbers n, k, and m, that described the size of the orbit, the shape of the orbit, and the direction in which the orbit was pointing." Because we use k for the Boltzmann constant, the azimuthal quantum number was changed to ℓ. When the modern quantum mechanics theory was put forward based on Heisenberg's matrix mechanics and Schrödinger's wave equation, these quantum numbers were kept in the current quantum theory but were changed to n being the principal quantum number, and m being the magnetic quantum number.

However, the final form of the electron shell model still in use today for the number of electrons in shells was discovered in 1923 by Edmund Stoner, who introduced the principle that the nth shell was described by 2(n^{2}). Seeing this in 1925, Wolfgang Pauli added a fourth quantum number, "spin", during the old quantum theory period of the Sommerfeld-Bohr Solar System atom to complete the modern electron shell theory.

== Subshells ==
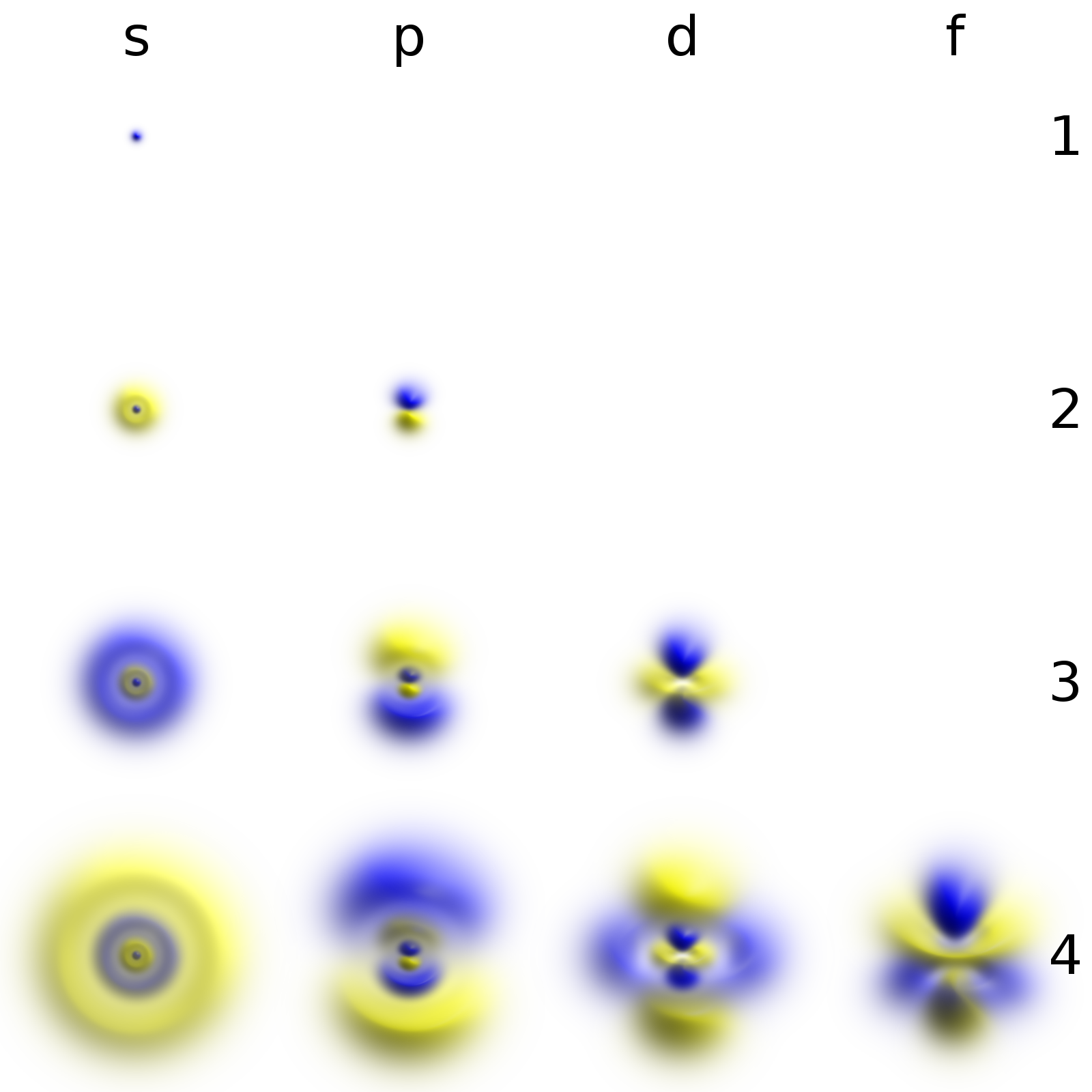
3D views of some hydrogen-like atomic orbitals showing probability density and phase (g orbitals and higher not shown)

Each shell is composed of one or more subshells, which are themselves composed of atomic orbitals. For example, the first (K) shell has one subshell, called 1s; the second (L) shell has two subshells, called 2s and 2p; the third shell has 3s, 3p, and 3d; the fourth shell has 4s, 4p, 4d and 4f; the fifth shell has 5s, 5p, 5d, and 5f and can theoretically hold more in the 5g subshell that is not occupied in the ground-state electron configuration of any known element. The various possible subshells are shown in the following table:

Subshell label	ℓ	Max electrons	Shells containing it	Historical name
s	0	2	Every shell	sharp
p	1	6	2nd shell and higher	principal
d	2	10	3rd shell and higher	diffuse
f	3	14	4th shell and higher	fundamental
g	4	18	5th shell and higher (theoretically)	(next in alphabet after f)

- The first column is the "subshell label", a lowercase-letter label for the type of subshell. For example, the "4s subshell" is a subshell of the fourth (N) shell, with the type (s) described in the first row.
- The second column is the azimuthal quantum number (ℓ) of the subshell. The precise definition involves quantum mechanics, but it is a number that characterizes the subshell.
- The third column is the maximum number of electrons that can be put into a subshell of that type. For example, the top row says that each s-type subshell (1s, 2s, etc.) can have at most two electrons in it. Each of the following subshells (p, d, f, g) can have 4 more electrons than the one preceding it.
- The fourth column says which shells have a subshell of that type. For example, looking at the top two rows, every shell has an s subshell, while only the second shell and higher have a p subshell (i.e., there is no "1p" subshell).
- The final column gives the historical origin of the labels s, p, d, and f. They come from early studies of atomic spectral lines. The other labels, namely g, h, and i, are an alphabetic continuation following the last historically originated label of f.

== Number of electrons in each shell ==
Each subshell is constrained to hold 4ℓ + 2 electrons at most, namely:

- Each s subshell holds at most 2 electrons
- Each p subshell holds at most 6 electrons
- Each d subshell holds at most 10 electrons
- Each f subshell holds at most 14 electrons
- Each g subshell holds at most 18 electrons

Therefore, the K shell, which contains only an s subshell, can hold up to 2 electrons; the L shell, which contains an s and a p, can hold up to 2 + 6 = 8 electrons, and so forth; in general, the nth shell can hold up to 2n^{2} electrons.

Shell name	Subshell name	Subshell max electrons	Shell max electrons
K	1s	2	2
L	2s	2	2 + 6 = 8
L	2p	6	2 + 6 = 8
M	3s	2	2 + 6 + 10 = 18
M	3p	6	2 + 6 + 10 = 18
M	3d	10	2 + 6 + 10 = 18
N	4s	2	2 + 6 + 10 + 14 = 32
N	4p	6	2 + 6 + 10 + 14 = 32
N	4d	10	2 + 6 + 10 + 14 = 32
N	4f	14	2 + 6 + 10 + 14 = 32
O	5s	2	2 + 6 + 10 + 14 + 18 = 50
O	5p	6	2 + 6 + 10 + 14 + 18 = 50
O	5d	10	2 + 6 + 10 + 14 + 18 = 50
O	5f	14	2 + 6 + 10 + 14 + 18 = 50
O	5g	18	2 + 6 + 10 + 14 + 18 = 50

Although that formula gives the maximum in principle, that maximum is only achieved (in known elements) for the first four shells (K, L, M, N). No known element has more than 32 electrons in any one shell. This is because the subshells are filled according to the Aufbau principle. The first elements to have more than 32 electrons in one shell would belong to the g-block of period 8 of the periodic table. These elements would have some electrons in their 5g subshell and thus have more than 32 electrons in the O shell (fifth principal shell).

== Subshell energies and filling order ==
For multielectron atoms n is a poor indicator of electron's energy. Energy spectra of some shells interleave.

The states crossed by each given red arrow have the same $n + \ell$ value. The direction of the red arrow indicates the order of state filling.

Although it is sometimes stated that all the electrons in a shell have the same energy, this is an approximation. However, the electrons in one subshell do have exactly the same level of energy, with later subshells having more energy per electron than earlier ones. This effect is great enough that the energy ranges associated with shells can overlap.

The filling of the shells and subshells with electrons proceeds from subshells of lower energy to subshells of higher energy. This follows the n + ℓ rule which is also commonly known as the Madelung rule. Subshells with a lower n + ℓ value are filled before those with higher n + ℓ values. In the case of equal n + ℓ values, the subshell with a lower n value is filled first.

Because of this, the later shells are filled over vast sections of the periodic table. The K shell fills in the first period (hydrogen and helium), while the L shell fills in the second (lithium to neon). However, the M shell starts filling at sodium (element 11) but does not finish filling till copper (element 29), and the N shell is even slower: it starts filling at potassium (element 19) but does not finish filling till ytterbium (element 70). The O, P, and Q shells begin filling in the known elements (respectively at rubidium, caesium, and francium), but they are not complete even at the heaviest known element, oganesson (element 118).

== List of elements with electrons per shell ==
The list below gives the elements arranged by increasing atomic number and shows the number of electrons per shell. At a glance, the subsets of the list show obvious patterns. In particular, every set of five elements ( electric blue) before each noble gas (group 18, yellow) heavier than helium have successive numbers of electrons in the outermost shell, namely three to seven.

Sorting the table by chemical group shows additional patterns, especially with respect to the last two outermost shells. (Elements 57 to 71 belong to the lanthanides, while 89 to 103 are the actinides.)

The list below is primarily consistent with the Aufbau principle. However, there are a number of exceptions to the rule; for example palladium (atomic number 46) has no electrons in the fifth shell, unlike other atoms with lower atomic number. The elements past 108 have such short half-lives that their electron configurations have not yet been measured, and so predictions have been inserted instead.

Z	Element	No. of electrons/shell	Group
1	Hydrogen	1	1
2	Helium	2	18
3	Lithium	2, 1	1
4	Beryllium	2, 2	2
5	Boron	2, 3	13
6	Carbon	2, 4	14
7	Nitrogen	2, 5	15
8	Oxygen	2, 6	16
9	Fluorine	2, 7	17
10	Neon	2, 8	18
11	Sodium	2, 8, 1	1
12	Magnesium	2, 8, 2	2
13	Aluminium	2, 8, 3	13
14	Silicon	2, 8, 4	14
15	Phosphorus	2, 8, 5	15
16	Sulfur	2, 8, 6	16
17	Chlorine	2, 8, 7	17
18	Argon	2, 8, 8	18
19	Potassium	2, 8, 8, 1	1
20	Calcium	2, 8, 8, 2	2
21	Scandium	2, 8, 9, 2	3
22	Titanium	2, 8, 10, 2	4
23	Vanadium	2, 8, 11, 2	5
24	Chromium	2, 8, 13, 1	6
25	Manganese	2, 8, 13, 2	7
26	Iron	2, 8, 14, 2	8
27	Cobalt	2, 8, 15, 2	9
28	Nickel	2, 8, 16, 2	10
29	Copper	2, 8, 18, 1	11
30	Zinc	2, 8, 18, 2	12
31	Gallium	2, 8, 18, 3	13
32	Germanium	2, 8, 18, 4	14
33	Arsenic	2, 8, 18, 5	15
34	Selenium	2, 8, 18, 6	16
35	Bromine	2, 8, 18, 7	17
36	Krypton	2, 8, 18, 8	18
37	Rubidium	2, 8, 18, 8, 1	1
38	Strontium	2, 8, 18, 8, 2	2
39	Yttrium	2, 8, 18, 9, 2	3
40	Zirconium	2, 8, 18, 10, 2	4
41	Niobium	2, 8, 18, 12, 1	5
42	Molybdenum	2, 8, 18, 13, 1	6
43	Technetium	2, 8, 18, 13, 2	7
44	Ruthenium	2, 8, 18, 15, 1	8
45	Rhodium	2, 8, 18, 16, 1	9
46	Palladium	2, 8, 18, 18	10
47	Silver	2, 8, 18, 18, 1	11
48	Cadmium	2, 8, 18, 18, 2	12
49	Indium	2, 8, 18, 18, 3	13
50	Tin	2, 8, 18, 18, 4	14
51	Antimony	2, 8, 18, 18, 5	15
52	Tellurium	2, 8, 18, 18, 6	16
53	Iodine	2, 8, 18, 18, 7	17
54	Xenon	2, 8, 18, 18, 8	18
55	Caesium	2, 8, 18, 18, 8, 1	1
56	Barium	2, 8, 18, 18, 8, 2	2
57	Lanthanum	2, 8, 18, 18, 9, 2	f-block groups
58	Cerium	2, 8, 18, 19, 9, 2	f-block groups
59	Praseodymium	2, 8, 18, 21, 8, 2	f-block groups
60	Neodymium	2, 8, 18, 22, 8, 2	f-block groups
61	Promethium	2, 8, 18, 23, 8, 2	f-block groups
62	Samarium	2, 8, 18, 24, 8, 2	f-block groups
63	Europium	2, 8, 18, 25, 8, 2	f-block groups
64	Gadolinium	2, 8, 18, 25, 9, 2	f-block groups
65	Terbium	2, 8, 18, 27, 8, 2	f-block groups
66	Dysprosium	2, 8, 18, 28, 8, 2	f-block groups
67	Holmium	2, 8, 18, 29, 8, 2	f-block groups
68	Erbium	2, 8, 18, 30, 8, 2	f-block groups
69	Thulium	2, 8, 18, 31, 8, 2	f-block groups
70	Ytterbium	2, 8, 18, 32, 8, 2	f-block groups
71	Lutetium	2, 8, 18, 32, 9, 2	3
72	Hafnium	2, 8, 18, 32, 10, 2	4
73	Tantalum	2, 8, 18, 32, 11, 2	5
74	Tungsten	2, 8, 18, 32, 12, 2	6
75	Rhenium	2, 8, 18, 32, 13, 2	7
76	Osmium	2, 8, 18, 32, 14, 2	8
77	Iridium	2, 8, 18, 32, 15, 2	9
78	Platinum	2, 8, 18, 32, 17, 1	10
79	Gold	2, 8, 18, 32, 18, 1	11
80	Mercury	2, 8, 18, 32, 18, 2	12
81	Thallium	2, 8, 18, 32, 18, 3	13
82	Lead	2, 8, 18, 32, 18, 4	14
83	Bismuth	2, 8, 18, 32, 18, 5	15
84	Polonium	2, 8, 18, 32, 18, 6	16
85	Astatine	2, 8, 18, 32, 18, 7	17
86	Radon	2, 8, 18, 32, 18, 8	18
87	Francium	2, 8, 18, 32, 18, 8, 1	1
88	Radium	2, 8, 18, 32, 18, 8, 2	2
89	Actinium	2, 8, 18, 32, 18, 9, 2	f-block groups
90	Thorium	2, 8, 18, 32, 18, 10, 2	f-block groups
91	Protactinium	2, 8, 18, 32, 20, 9, 2	f-block groups
92	Uranium	2, 8, 18, 32, 21, 9, 2	f-block groups
93	Neptunium	2, 8, 18, 32, 22, 9, 2	f-block groups
94	Plutonium	2, 8, 18, 32, 24, 8, 2	f-block groups
95	Americium	2, 8, 18, 32, 25, 8, 2	f-block groups
96	Curium	2, 8, 18, 32, 25, 9, 2	f-block groups
97	Berkelium	2, 8, 18, 32, 27, 8, 2	f-block groups
98	Californium	2, 8, 18, 32, 28, 8, 2	f-block groups
99	Einsteinium	2, 8, 18, 32, 29, 8, 2	f-block groups
100	Fermium	2, 8, 18, 32, 30, 8, 2	f-block groups
101	Mendelevium	2, 8, 18, 32, 31, 8, 2	f-block groups
102	Nobelium	2, 8, 18, 32, 32, 8, 2	f-block groups
103	Lawrencium	2, 8, 18, 32, 32, 8, 3	3
104	Rutherfordium	2, 8, 18, 32, 32, 10, 2	4
105	Dubnium	2, 8, 18, 32, 32, 11, 2	5
106	Seaborgium	2, 8, 18, 32, 32, 12, 2	6
107	Bohrium	2, 8, 18, 32, 32, 13, 2	7
108	Hassium	2, 8, 18, 32, 32, 14, 2	8
109	Meitnerium	2, 8, 18, 32, 32, 15, 2 (?)	9
110	Darmstadtium	2, 8, 18, 32, 32, 16, 2 (?)	10
111	Roentgenium	2, 8, 18, 32, 32, 17, 2 (?)	11
112	Copernicium	2, 8, 18, 32, 32, 18, 2 (?)	12
113	Nihonium	2, 8, 18, 32, 32, 18, 3 (?)	13
114	Flerovium	2, 8, 18, 32, 32, 18, 4 (?)	14
115	Moscovium	2, 8, 18, 32, 32, 18, 5 (?)	15
116	Livermorium	2, 8, 18, 32, 32, 18, 6 (?)	16
117	Tennessine	2, 8, 18, 32, 32, 18, 7 (?)	17
118	Oganesson	2, 8, 18, 32, 32, 18, 8 (?)	18

== See also ==
- Periodic table (electron configurations)
- Electron counting
- 18-electron rule
- Core charge
