= Hydrogen-like atom =

Atoms with a single valence electron, so they behave like hydrogen

A hydrogen-like atom (or hydrogenic atom) is any atom or ion with a single electron. Examples of hydrogen-like atoms are H, He^{+}, Li^{2+}, Be^{3+} and so on, as well as any of their isotopes. These ions are isoelectronic with hydrogen and are sometimes called hydrogen-like ions. The non-relativistic Schrödinger equation and relativistic Dirac equation for the hydrogen atom and hydrogen-like atoms can be solved analytically, owing to the simplicity of the two-particle physical system. The one-electron wave function solutions are referred to as hydrogen-like atomic orbitals. Hydrogen-like atoms are of importance because their corresponding orbitals bear similarity to the hydrogen atomic orbitals.

The definition of hydrogen-like atoms can be extended to also include any system with only one valence electron (but more core electrons). Examples such atoms include, but are not limited to, all alkali metals such as Rb and Cs and singly ionized alkaline earth metals such as Ca^{+} and Sr^{+}. In such a case, the hydrogen-like atom includes a positively charged core consisting of the atomic nucleus and any core electrons, as well as a single valence electron. Because helium is common in the universe, the spectroscopy of singly ionized helium is important in EUV astronomy, for example, of DO white dwarf stars.

Other systems may also be referred to as "hydrogen-like atoms", such as muonium (an electron orbiting an antimuon), positronium (an electron and a positron), certain exotic atoms (formed with other particles), or Rydberg atoms (in which one electron is in such a high energy state that it sees the rest of the atom effectively as a point charge).

== Rydberg atoms ==
Highly excited states of neutral atoms are well described in terms of one electron around a nucleus of a single positive charge resembling a hydrogen atom. These states are called Rydberg atoms. They have important applications in astrophysics, including in the dynamics of the primordial gas of the Big Bang.

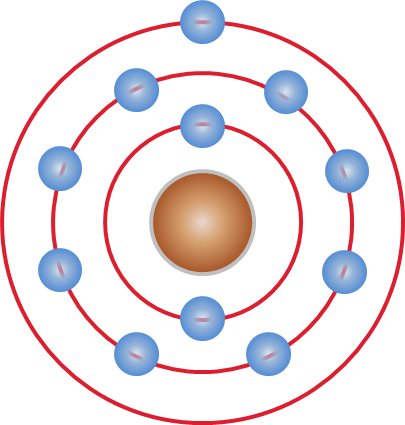
In an idealized Bohr model alkali atom (such as sodium, pictured here), the single outer-shell electron stays outside the ionic core and it would be expected to behave just as if in the same orbital of a hydrogen atom.

The hydrogen-like approximation becomes poor for Rydberg atoms, even if they have only one valence electron, because the wavefunction of the valence electron is non-negligible in the ion core where the core electrons can no longer effectively screen the outer electrons.

As discussed below, the 1/r potential in the hydrogen atom leads to an electron binding energy given by
$$E_\text{B} = -\dfrac{Rhc}{n^2},$$
where $R$ is the Rydberg constant, $h$ is the Planck constant, $c$ is the speed of light and $n$ is the principal quantum number. For alkali atoms with small orbital angular momentum, the spectrum is still described well by the Rydberg formula with an angular momentum dependent quantum defect, $\delta_l$:
$$E_\text{B} = -\dfrac{Rhc}{(n-\delta_l)^2}.$$

The largest shifts occur when the orbital angular momentum is zero (normally labeled 's') and these are shown in the table for the alkali metals:

Element	Configuration	$n-\delta_s$	$\delta_s$
Li	2s	1.59	0.41
Na	3s	1.63	1.37
K	4s	1.77	2.23
Rb	5s	1.81	3.19
Cs	6s	1.87	4.13

== Schrödinger solution ==
In the solution to the Schrödinger equation, which is non-relativistic, hydrogen-like atomic orbitals are eigenfunctions of the one-electron angular momentum operator L (more precisely, its square, L^{2}) and its z-component L_{z}. A hydrogen-like atomic orbital is uniquely identified by the values of the principal quantum number n, the angular momentum quantum number ℓ, and the magnetic quantum number m. The energy eigenvalues do not depend on ℓ or m, but solely on n. To these must be added the two-valued spin quantum number m_{s} = ±1/2, setting the stage for the Aufbau principle. This principle restricts the allowed values of the four quantum numbers in electron configurations of more-electron atoms. In hydrogen-like atoms all degenerate orbitals of fixed n and ℓ, m and s varying between certain values (see below) form an atomic shell.

The Schrödinger equation of atoms or ions with more than one electron has not been solved analytically, because of the computational difficulty imposed by the Coulomb interaction between the electrons. Numerical methods must be applied in order to obtain (approximate) wavefunctions or other properties from quantum mechanical calculations. Due to the spherical symmetry (of the Hamiltonian), the total angular momentum J of an atom is a conserved quantity. Many numerical procedures start from products of atomic orbitals that are eigenfunctions of the one-electron operators L and L_{z}. The radial parts of these atomic orbitals are sometimes numerical tables or are sometimes Slater orbitals. By angular momentum coupling many-electron eigenfunctions of J^{2} (and possibly S^{2}) are constructed.

In quantum chemical calculations hydrogen-like atomic orbitals cannot serve as an expansion basis, because they are not complete. The non-square-integrable continuum (E > 0) states must be included to obtain a complete set, i.e., to span all of one-electron Hilbert space. This was observed as early as 1928 by E. A. Hylleraas, and later by Harrison Shull and Per-Olov Löwdin.

In the simplest model, the atomic orbitals of hydrogen-like atoms/ions are solutions to the Schrödinger equation in a spherically symmetric potential. In this case, the potential term is the potential given by Coulomb's law:
$$V(r) = -\frac{1}{4 \pi \varepsilon_0} \frac{Ze^2}{r}$$
where

- ε_{0} is the permittivity of the vacuum,
- Z is the atomic number (number of protons in the nucleus),
- e is the elementary charge (charge of an electron),
- r is the distance of the electron from the nucleus.

After writing the wave function as a product of functions:
$$\psi(r, \theta, \phi) = R_{nl}(r)Y_{\ell m}(\theta,\phi)$$
(in spherical coordinates), where Y_{ℓm} are spherical harmonics, we arrive at the following Schrödinger equation:
$$- \frac{\hbar^2}{2\mu} \left[\frac{1}{r^2} \frac{\partial}{\partial r}\left(r^2 \frac{\partial R(r)}{\partial r}\right) - \frac{\ell(\ell+1)R(r)}{r^2} \right] + V(r)R(r) = E R(r),$$
where μ is, approximately, the mass of the electron (more accurately, it is the reduced mass of the system consisting of the electron and the nucleus), and ħ is the reduced Planck constant.

Different values of ℓ give solutions with different angular momentum, where ℓ (a non-negative integer) is the quantum number of the orbital angular momentum. The magnetic quantum number m in Y_{ℓm} (satisfying −ℓ ≤ m ≤ ℓ), is the (quantized) projection of the orbital angular momentum on the z-axis. See Particle in a spherically symmetric potential § Hydrogen-like atoms for the steps leading to the solution of this equation.

=== Non-relativistic wavefunction and energy ===
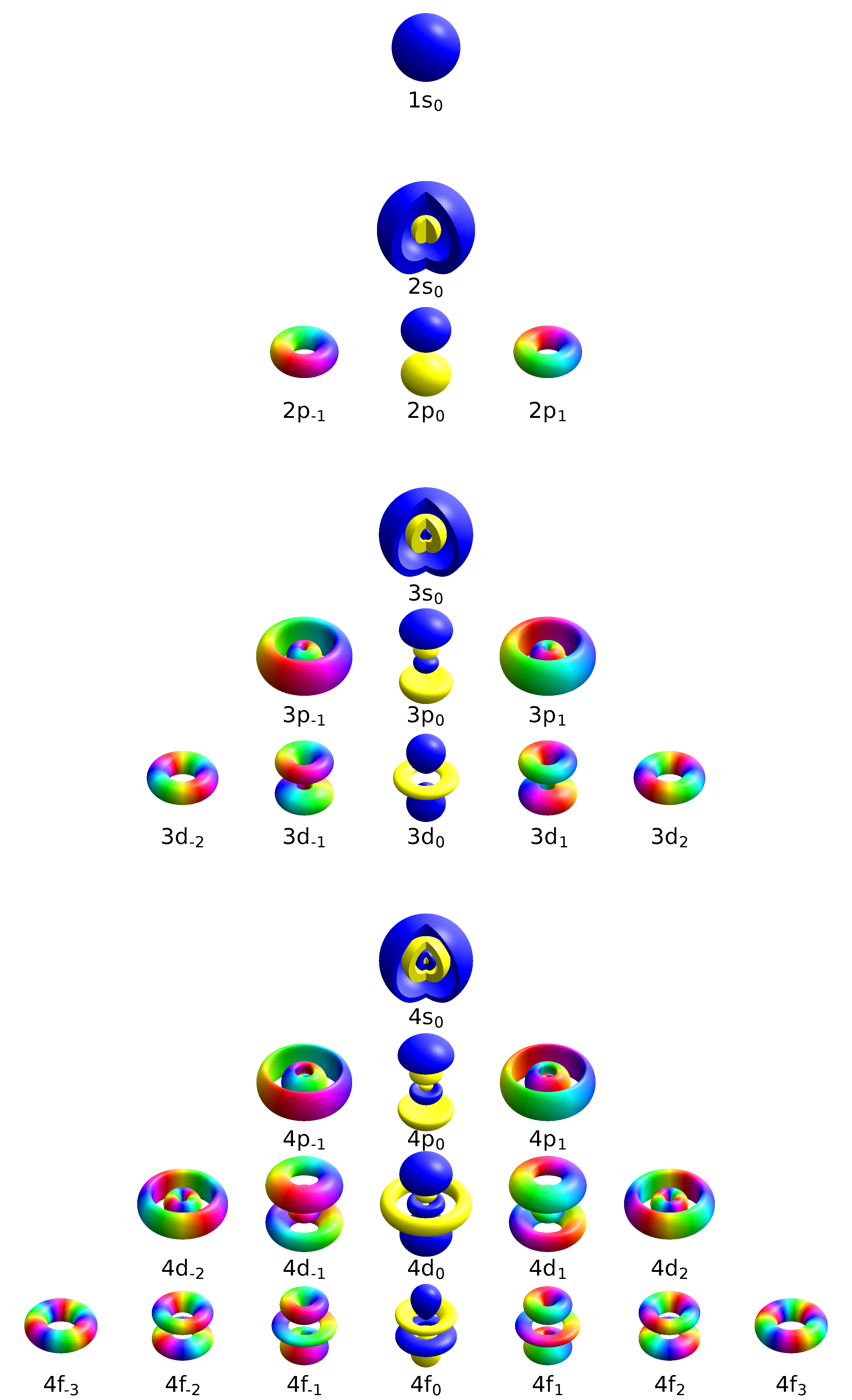
Complete set of ψ_{nℓm} eigenfunctions up to n = 4. The solid orbitals enclose the volume above a certain probability density threshold. The colors depict the complex phase.

In addition to ℓ and m, a third integer n > 0, emerges from the boundary conditions placed on R. The functions R and Y that solve the equations above depend on the values of these integers, called quantum numbers. It is customary to subscript the wave functions with the values of the quantum numbers they depend on. The final expression for the normalized wave function is:
$$\psi_{n \ell m} = R_{n \ell}(r)\, Y_{\ell m}(\theta,\phi)$$
$$R_{n \ell} (r) = \sqrt {{\left ( \frac{2 Z}{n a_{\mu}} \right ) }^3\frac{(n-\ell-1)!}{2n{(n+\ell)!}} } e^{- Z r / {n a_{\mu}}} \left ( \frac{2 Z r}{n a_{\mu}} \right )^{\ell} L_{n-\ell-1}^{(2\ell+1)} \left ( \frac{2 Z r}{n a_{\mu}} \right )$$
where:

- $L_{n-\ell-1}^{(2 \ell+1)}$ are the generalized Laguerre polynomials.
- $a_{\mu} = \frac{4\pi\varepsilon_0\hbar^2}{\mu e^2} = \frac{\hbar c}{\alpha\mu c^2} =\frac{m_{\mathrm{e}}}{\mu} a_0$
  where α is the fine-structure constant. Here, μ is the reduced mass of the nucleus–electron system, that is, $\mu = {m_\mathrm{N} m_\mathrm{e}} / {(m_\mathrm{N}+m_\mathrm{e})}$, where m_{N} is the mass of the nucleus. Typically, the nucleus is much more massive than the electron, so μ ≈ m_{e} (but in positronium, for instance, μ ≈ m_{e}/2). a_{0} is the Bohr radius.
- $E_{n} = -\left(\frac{Z^2 \mu e^4}{32 \pi^2\epsilon_0^2\hbar^2}\right)\frac{1}{n^2} = -\left(\frac{Z^2\hbar^2}{2\mu a_{\mu}^2}\right)\frac{1}{n^2} = -\frac{\mu c^2Z^2\alpha^2}{2n^2}.$
- $Y_{\ell m} (\theta,\phi)$ function is a spherical harmonic.

parity due to angular wave function is (−1)^{ℓ}.

=== Quantum numbers ===
The quantum numbers n, ℓ and m are integers and can have the following values:
$$n=1,2,3,4, \dots$$
$$\ell=0,1,2,\dots,n-1$$
$$m=-\ell,-\ell+1,\ldots,0,\ldots,\ell-1,\ell$$

For a group-theoretical interpretation of these quantum numbers, see Runge–Lenz § Quantum mechanics of the hydrogen atom. Among other things, this article gives group-theoretical reasons why ℓ < n and −ℓ ≤ m ≤ ℓ.

=== Angular momentum ===
Each atomic orbital is associated with an angular momentum L. It is a vector operator, and the eigenvalues of its square L^{2} ≡ L_{x}^{2} + L_{y}^{2} + L_{z}^{2} are given by:
$$\hat{L}^2 Y_{\ell m} = \hbar^2 \ell(\ell+1) Y_{\ell m}$$

The projection of this vector onto an arbitrary direction is quantized. If the arbitrary direction is labelled 'z', the quantization is given by:
$$\hat{L}_\text{z} Y_{\ell m} = \hbar m Y_{\ell m},$$
where m is restricted as described above. Note that L^{2} and L_{z} commute and have a common eigenstate, which is in accordance with Heisenberg's uncertainty principle. Since L_{x} and L_{y} do not commute with L_{z}, it is not possible to find a state that is an eigenstate of all three components simultaneously. Hence the values of the x- and y-components are not sharp, but are given by a probability function of finite width. The fact that the x- and y-components are not well-determined, implies that the direction of the angular momentum vector is not well determined either, although its component along the z-axis is sharp.

These relations do not give the total angular momentum of the electron. For that, electron spin must be included.

This quantization of angular momentum closely parallels that proposed by Niels Bohr (see Bohr model) in 1913, with no knowledge of wavefunctions.

=== Including spin–orbit interaction ===
In a real atom, the spin of a moving electron can interact with the electric field of the nucleus through relativistic effects, a phenomenon known as spin–orbit interaction. When one takes this coupling into account, the spin and the orbital angular momentum are no longer conserved, which can be pictured by the electron precessing. Therefore, one has to replace the quantum numbers ℓ, m and the projection of the spin m_{s} by quantum numbers that represent the total angular momentum (including spin), j and m_{j}, as well as the quantum number of parity.

See the next section on the Dirac equation for a solution that includes the coupling.

== Solution to Dirac equation ==
In 1928 in England Paul Dirac found an equation that was fully compatible with special relativity. The equation was solved for hydrogen-like atoms weeks later (assuming a simple Coulomb potential around a point charge) independently by Walter Gordon and Charles Galton Darwin. Instead of a single (possibly complex) function as in the Schrödinger equation, one must find four complex functions that make up a Dirac spinor. The first and second functions (or components of the spinor) correspond (in the usual basis) to spin "up" and spin "down" states, as do the third and fourth components.

The terms "spin up" and "spin down" are relative to a chosen direction, conventionally the z-direction. An electron may be in a superposition of spin up and spin down, which corresponds to the spin axis pointing in some other direction. The spin state may depend on location.

An electron in the vicinity of a nucleus necessarily has non-zero amplitudes for the third and fourth components. Far from the nucleus these may be small, but near the nucleus they become large.

=== Quantum numbers ===
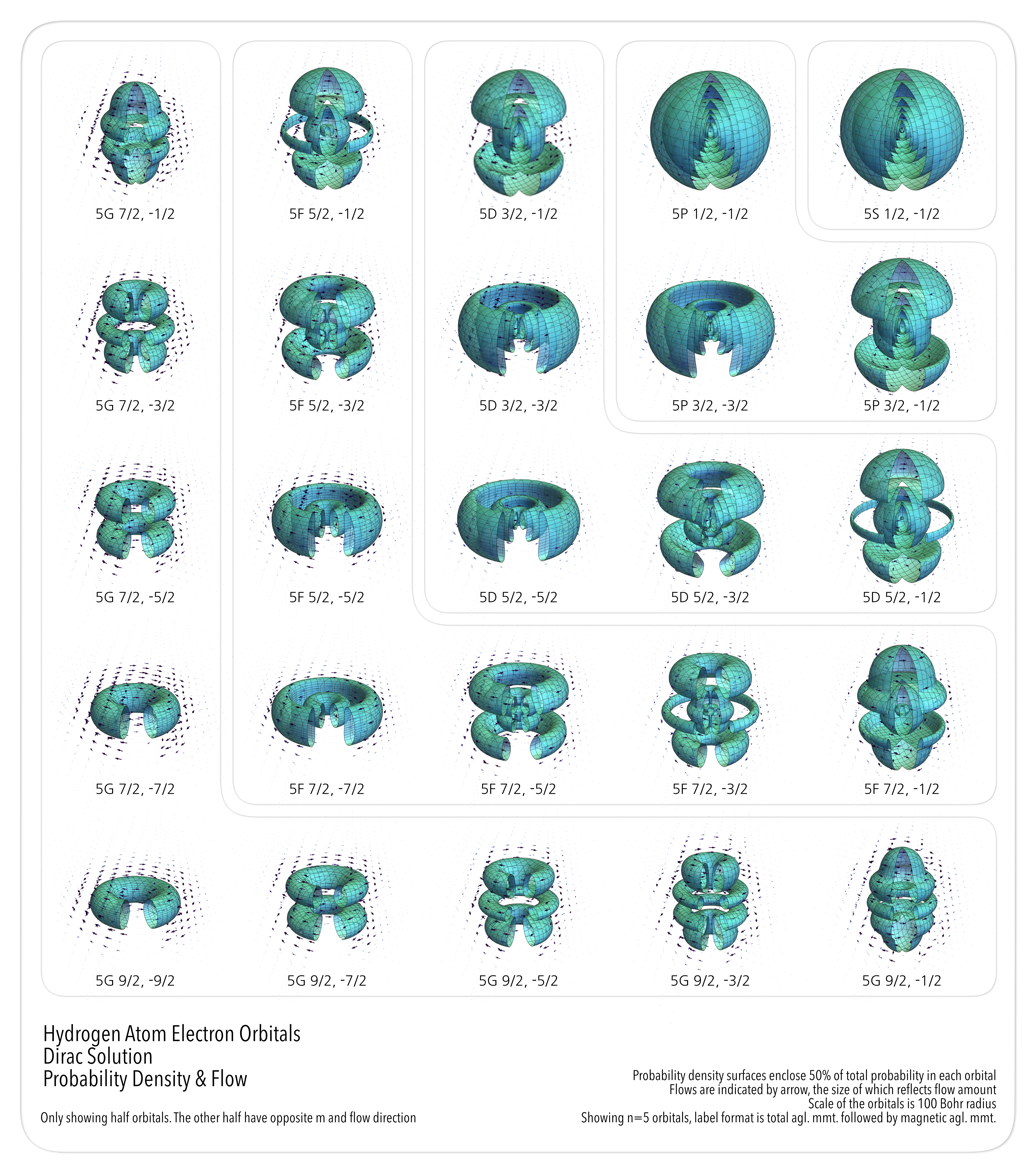
Hydrogen atom electron orbitals (n=5) in Dirac solution, showing probability density and flow. Drawn at 50% probability density and on scale of 100 a_{0}.

The eigenfunctions of the Hamiltonian, which means functions with a definite energy (and which therefore do not evolve except for a phase shift), have energies characterized not by the quantum number n only (as for the Schrödinger equation), but by n and a quantum number j, the total angular momentum quantum number. The quantum number j determines the sum of the squares of the three angular momenta to be j(j + 1) (times ħ^{2}, see Planck constant). These angular momenta include both orbital angular momentum (having to do with the angular dependence of ψ) and spin angular momentum (having to do with the spin state). The splitting of the energies of states of the same principal quantum number n due to differences in j is called fine structure. The total angular momentum quantum number j ranges from 1/2 to n − 1/2.

The orbitals for a given state can be written using two radial functions and two angle functions. The radial functions depend on both the principal quantum number n and an integer k, defined as:

$$k = \begin{cases}
-j-\tfrac 1 2 & \text{if }j=\ell+\tfrac 1 2 \\
j+\tfrac 1 2 & \text{if }j=\ell-\tfrac 1 2
\end{cases}$$

where ℓ is the azimuthal quantum number that ranges from 0 to n − 1. The angle functions depend on k and on a quantum number m, which ranges from −j to j by steps of 1. The states are labeled using the letters S, P, D, F etc. to stand for states with ℓ equal to 0, 1, 2, 3, etc. (see Azimuthal quantum number), with a subscript giving j. For instance, the states for n = 4 are given in the following table (these would be prefaced by n, for example 4S_{1/2}):

	m = −7/2	m = −5/2	m = −3/2	m = −1/2	m = 1/2	m = 3/2	m = 5/2	m = 7/2
k = 3, ℓ = 3		F_{5/2}	F_{5/2}	F_{5/2}	F_{5/2}	F_{5/2}	F_{5/2}	
k = 2, ℓ = 2			D_{3/2}	D_{3/2}	D_{3/2}	D_{3/2}		
k = 1, ℓ = 1				P_{1/2}	P_{1/2}			
k = 0								
k = −1, ℓ = 0				S_{1/2}	S_{1/2}			
k = −2, ℓ = 1			P_{3/2}	P_{3/2}	P_{3/2}	P_{3/2}		
k = −3, ℓ = 2		D_{5/2}	D_{5/2}	D_{5/2}	D_{5/2}	D_{5/2}	D_{5/2}	
k = −4, ℓ = 3	F_{7/2}	F_{7/2}	F_{7/2}	F_{7/2}	F_{7/2}	F_{7/2}	F_{7/2}	F_{7/2}

These can be additionally labeled with a subscript giving m. There are 2n^{2} states with principal quantum number n, 4j + 2 of them with any allowed j except the highest (j = n − 1/2) for which there are only 2j + 1. Since the orbitals having given values of n and j have the same energy according to the Dirac equation, they form a basis for the space of functions having that energy.

=== Energy ===
The energy, as a function of n and |k| (equal to j + 1/2), is:
$$\begin{array}{rl}
E_{n\,j} & = \mu c^2\left(1+\left[\dfrac{Z\alpha}{n-|k|+\sqrt{k^2-Z^2\alpha^2}}\right]^2\right)^{-1/2}\\
&\\
& \approx \mu c^2\left\{1-\dfrac{Z^2\alpha^2}{2n^2} \left[1 + \dfrac{Z^2\alpha^2}n\left(\dfrac 1{|k|} - \dfrac 3{4n} \right) \right]\right\}
\end{array}$$

(The energy of course depends on the zero-point used.) Note that if Z were able to be more than 137 (higher than any known element) then we would have a negative value inside the square root for the S_{1/2} and P_{1/2} orbitals, which means they would not exist. The Schrödinger solution corresponds to replacing the inner bracket in the second expression by 1. The accuracy of the energy difference between the lowest two hydrogen states calculated from the Schrödinger solution is about 9 ppm (90 μeV too low, out of around 10 eV), whereas the accuracy of the Dirac equation for the same energy difference is about 3 ppm (too high). The Schrödinger solution always puts the states at slightly higher energies than the more accurate Dirac equation. The Dirac equation gives some levels of hydrogen quite accurately (for instance the 4P_{1/2} state is given an energy only about 2×10^{−10} eV too high), others less so (for instance, the 2S_{1/2} level is about 4×10^{−6} eV too low). The modifications of the energy due to using the Dirac equation rather than the Schrödinger solution is of the order of α^{2}, and for this reason α is called the fine-structure constant.

=== General solution of Dirac equation ===
In the general case, the solution to the Dirac equation for quantum numbers n, k, and m, is:
$$\Psi=\begin{pmatrix}
g_{n,k}(r)r^{-1}\Omega_{k,m}(\theta,\phi)\\
if_{n,k}(r)r^{-1}\Omega_{-k,m}(\theta,\phi)
\end{pmatrix}=\begin{pmatrix}
g_{n,k}(r)r^{-1}\sqrt{(k+\tfrac 1 2 -m)/(2k+1)}Y_{k,m-1/2}(\theta,\phi)\\
-g_{n,k}(r)r^{-1}\sgn k\sqrt{(k+\tfrac 1 2 +m)/(2k+1)}Y_{k,m+1/2}(\theta,\phi)\\
if_{n,k}(r)r^{-1}\sqrt{(-k+\tfrac 1 2 -m)/(-2k+1)}Y_{-k,m-1/2}(\theta,\phi)\\
if_{n,k}(r)r^{-1}\sgn k\sqrt{(-k+\tfrac 1 2 +m)/(-2k+1)}Y_{-k,m+1/2}(\theta,\phi)
\end{pmatrix}$$
where the Ωs are columns of the two spherical harmonics functions shown to the right. $Y_{a,b}(\theta,\phi)$ signifies a spherical harmonic function:

$$Y_{a,b}(\theta,\phi)= \begin{cases}
(-1)^b\sqrt{\frac{2a+1}{4\pi}\frac{(a-b)!}{(a+b)!}}P_a^b(\cos\theta)e^{ib\phi} & \text{if }a>0\\
Y_{-a-1,b}(\theta,\phi)& \text{if }a<0
\end{cases}$$

in which P^{b}_{a} is an associated Legendre polynomial. (Note that the definition of Ω may involve a spherical harmonic that doesn't exist, like Y_{0,1}, but the coefficient on it will be zero.)

Here is the behavior of some of these angular functions. The normalization factor is left out to simplify the expressions.

$$\Omega_{-1,-1/2}\propto\binom 0 1$$
$$\Omega_{-1,1/2}\propto\binom 1 0$$
$$\Omega_{1,-1/2}\propto\binom{(x-iy)/r}{z/r}$$
$$\Omega_{1,1/2}\propto\binom{z/r}{(x+iy)/r}$$

From these we see that in the S_{1/2} orbital (k = −1), the top two components of Ψ have zero orbital angular momentum like Schrödinger S orbitals, but the bottom two components are orbitals like the Schrödinger P orbitals. In the P_{1/2} solution (k = 1), the situation is reversed. In both cases, the spin of each component compensates for its orbital angular momentum around the z-axis to give the right value for the total angular momentum around the z-axis.

The two Ω spinors obey the relationship:

$$\Omega_{k,m}=\begin{pmatrix}
z/r & (x-iy)/r\\
(x+iy)/r & -z/r
\end{pmatrix}\Omega_{-k,m}$$

To write the functions g_{n,k}(r) and f_{n,k}(r) let us define a scaled radius ρ:

$$\rho\equiv 2Cr$$

with

$$C=\frac{\sqrt{\mu^2c^4-E^2}}{\hbar c}$$

where E is the energy (E_{n j}) given above. We also define γ as:

$$\gamma\equiv\sqrt{k^2-Z^2\alpha^2}$$

g_{n,k}(r) and f_{n,k}(r) are based on two generalized Laguerre polynomials of order n − |k| − 1 and n − |k|:

$$g_{n,k}(r)=A\rho^\gamma e^{-\rho/2}\left(Z\alpha\rho L_{n-|k|-1}^{(2\gamma+1)}(\rho)+(\gamma-k)\frac{\gamma\mu c^2-kE}{\hbar cC}L_{n-|k|}^{(2\gamma-1)}(\rho)\right)$$
$$f_{n,k}(r)=A\rho^\gamma e^{-\rho/2}\left((\gamma-k)\rho L_{n-|k|-1}^{(2\gamma+1)}(\rho)+Z\alpha\frac{\gamma\mu c^2-kE}{\hbar cC}L_{n-|k|}^{(2\gamma-1)}(\rho)\right)$$

where A is a normalization constant involving the gamma function:

$$A=\frac 1{\sqrt{2k(k-\gamma)}}\sqrt{\frac C{n-|k|+\gamma}\frac{(n-|k|-1)!}{\Gamma(n-|k|+2\gamma+1)}\frac 1 2\left(\left(\frac{Ek}{\gamma\mu c^2}\right)^2+\frac{Ek}{\gamma\mu c^2}\right)}$$

f is small compared to g (except at very small r) because when k is positive the first terms dominate, and α is big compared to γ − k, whereas when k is negative the second terms dominate and α is small compared to γ − k. Note that the dominant term is quite similar to corresponding the Schrödinger solution – the upper index on the Laguerre polynomial is slightly less (2γ + 1 or 2γ − 1 rather than 2ℓ + 1, which is the nearest integer), as is the power of ρ (γ or γ − 1 instead of ℓ, the nearest integer). The exponential decay is slightly faster than in the Schrödinger solution.

The normalization factor makes the integral over all space of the square of the absolute value equal to 1.

When k = −n (which corresponds to the highest j possible for a given n, such as 1S_{1/2}, 2P_{3/2}, 3D_{5/2}, ...), then g_{n,k}(r) and f_{n,k}(r) are:

$$g_{n,-n}(r)=A(n+\gamma)\rho^\gamma e^{-\rho/2}$$
$$f_{n,-n}(r)=AZ\alpha\rho^\gamma e^{-\rho/2}$$

With A now reduced to:

$$A=\frac 1{\sqrt{2n(n+\gamma)}}\sqrt\frac C{2\gamma^2n^2\Gamma(2\gamma+1)}$$

The factor Zα means f(r) is small compared to g(r). The energy is given by

$$E_{n,n-1/2}=\frac\gamma n\mu c^2=\sqrt{1-\frac{Z^2\alpha^2}{n^2}}\,\mu c^2$$

and the radial decay constant C by

$$C=\frac{Z\alpha}n\frac{\mu c^2}{\hbar c}.$$

=== 1S orbital ===
Here is the 1S_{1/2} orbital, spin up, without normalization:

$$\Psi\propto\begin{pmatrix}
(1+\gamma)r^{\gamma-1}e^{-Cr}\\
0\\
iZ\alpha r^{\gamma-1}e^{-Cr}z/r\\
iZ\alpha r^{\gamma-1}e^{-Cr}(x+iy)/r
\end{pmatrix}$$

Note that γ is a little less than 1, so the top function is similar to an exponentially decreasing function of r except that at very small r it theoretically goes to infinity. But the value of the r^{γ−1} surpasses 10 only at a value of r smaller than 10^{1/(γ−1)}, which is very small (much less than the radius of a proton) unless Z is very large.

The 1S_{1/2} orbital, spin down, without normalization, comes out as:

$$\Psi\propto\begin{pmatrix}
0\\
(1+\gamma)r^{\gamma-1}e^{-Cr}\\
iZ\alpha r^{\gamma-1}e^{-Cr}(x-iy)/r\\
-iZ\alpha r^{\gamma-1}e^{-Cr}z/r
\end{pmatrix}$$

We can mix these in order to obtain orbitals with the spin oriented in some other direction, such as:

$$\Psi\propto\begin{pmatrix}
(1+\gamma)r^{\gamma-1}e^{-Cr}\\
(1+\gamma)r^{\gamma-1}e^{-Cr}\\
iZ\alpha r^{\gamma-1}e^{-Cr}(x-iy+z)/r\\
iZ\alpha r^{\gamma-1}e^{-Cr}(x+iy-z)/r
\end{pmatrix}$$

which corresponds to the spin and angular momentum axis pointing in the x-direction. Adding i times the "down" spin to the "up" spin gives an orbital oriented in the y-direction.

=== 2P_{1/2} and 2S_{1/2} orbitals ===
To give another example, the 2P_{1/2} orbital, spin up, is proportional to:

$$\Psi\propto\begin{pmatrix}
\rho^{\gamma-1} e^{-\rho/2}\left(Z\alpha\rho+(\gamma-1)\frac{\gamma\mu c^2-E}{\hbar cC}(-\rho+2\gamma)\right)z/r\\
\rho^{\gamma-1} e^{-\rho/2}\left(Z\alpha\rho+(\gamma-1)\frac{\gamma\mu c^2-E}{\hbar cC}(-\rho+2\gamma)\right)(x+iy)/r\\
i\rho^{\gamma-1}e^{-\rho/2}\left((\gamma-1)\rho+Z\alpha\frac{\gamma\mu c^2-E}{\hbar cC}(-\rho+2\gamma)\right)\\
0
\end{pmatrix}$$

(Remember that ρ = 2rC. C is about half what it is for the 1S orbital, but γ is still the same.)

Notice that when ρ is small compared to α (or r is small compared to ħc/(μc^{2})) the "S" type orbital dominates (the third component of the Dirac spinor).

For the 2S_{1/2} spin up orbital, we have:

$$\Psi\propto\begin{pmatrix}
\rho^{\gamma-1} e^{-\rho/2}\left(Z\alpha\rho+(\gamma+1)\frac{\gamma\mu c^2+E}{\hbar cC}(-\rho+2\gamma)\right)\\
0\\
i\rho^{\gamma-1}e^{-\rho/2}\left((\gamma+1)\rho+Z\alpha\frac{\gamma\mu c^2+E}{\hbar cC}(-\rho+2\gamma)\right)z/r\\
i\rho^{\gamma-1}e^{-\rho/2}\left((\gamma+1)\rho+Z\alpha\frac{\gamma\mu c^2+E}{\hbar cC}(-\rho+2\gamma)\right)(x+iy)/r
\end{pmatrix}$$

Now the first component is S-like and there is a radius near ρ = 2 where it goes to zero, whereas the bottom two-component part is P-like.

=== Negative-energy solutions ===
In addition to bound states, in which the energy is less than that of an electron infinitely separated from the nucleus, there are solutions to the Dirac equation at higher energy, corresponding to an unbound electron interacting with the nucleus. These solutions are not normalizable, but solutions can be found which tend toward zero as r goes to infinity (which is not possible when |E| < μc^{2} except at the above-mentioned bound-state values of E). There are similar solutions with E < −μc^{2}. These negative-energy solutions are just like positive-energy solutions having the opposite energy but for a case in which the nucleus repels the electron instead of attracting it, except that the solutions for the top two components switch places with those for the bottom two.

Negative-energy solutions to Dirac's equation exist even in the absence of a Coulomb force exerted by a nucleus. Dirac hypothesized that we can consider almost all of these states to be already filled. If one of these negative-energy states is not filled, this manifests itself as though there is an electron which is repelled by a positively-charged nucleus. This prompted Dirac to hypothesize the existence of positively-charged electrons, and his prediction was confirmed with the discovery of the positron.

== Relativistic quantum field theory ==
The Dirac equation with a simple Coulomb potential generated by a point-like non-magnetic nucleus was not the last word, and its predictions differ from experimental results as mentioned earlier. More accurate results include the Lamb shift (radiative corrections arising from quantum electrodynamics) and hyperfine structure.

== See also ==
- Rydberg atom
- Positronium
- Exotic atom
- Two-electron atom
- Hydrogen molecular ion
