= Applied Radiation and Isotopes =

- Discipline: Nuclear, radiation and radionuclide techniques
- Language: English
- Edited by: Richard P. Hugtenburg, Denis Bergeron

Publication details
- Former names: International Journal of Radiation Applications and Instrumentation. Part A. Applied Radiation and Isotopes; along with other previous journals
- History: 1993–present
- Publisher: Elsevier
- Frequency: Monthly
- Open access: Hybrid
- Impact factor: 1.8 (2024)

Standard abbreviations
- ISO 4: Appl. Radiat. Isot.

Indexing
- CODEN: ARISEF
- ISSN: 0969-8043

Links
- Journal homepage; Online archive

Applied Radiation and Isotopes is a peer-reviewed scientific journal published by Elsevier. It was established in 1993 and its scope covers applications of ionizing radiation and radionuclides.

The editors-in-chief are Richard P. Hugtenburg (Swansea University) and Denis Bergeron (National Institute of Standards and Technology).

== Abstracting and indexing ==
The journal is abstracted and indexed in:

- Chemical Abstracts Service
- Index Medicus/MEDLINE/PubMed
- Science Citation Index Expanded

According to the Journal Citation Reports, the journal has a 2024 impact factor of 1.8.

== Former titles history ==
The history of the journal is as follows:

- The International Journal of Applied Radiation and Isotopes (1956–1985)
- International Journal of Radiation Applications and Instrumentation. Part A. Applied Radiation and Isotopes (1986–1992)
- Applied Radiation and Isotopes (1992–present)
