= Rydberg matter =

Exotic phase of matter formed by Rydberg atoms

Rydberg matter is an exotic phase of matter formed by Rydberg atoms; it was predicted around 1980 by É. A. Manykin, M. I. Ozhovan (Ojovan) and P. P. Poluéktov. It has been formed from various elements like caesium, potassium, hydrogen and nitrogen; studies have been conducted on theoretical possibilities like sodium, beryllium, magnesium and calcium. It has been suggested to be a material that diffuse interstellar bands may arise from. Circular Rydberg states, where the outermost electron is found in a planar circular orbit, are the most long-lived, with lifetimes of up to several hours, and are the most common.

== Physical ==
A 19-atom planar Rydberg matter cluster. At the seventh excitation level, spectroscopy on K_{19} clusters showed the bond distance to be 5.525 nm.

Schematic of valence electron distribution in a Rydberg matter made of excited (n=10) Cs atoms

Rydberg matter consists of usually hexagonal planar clusters; these cannot be very big because of the retardation effect caused by the finite velocity of the speed of light. Hence, they are not gases or plasmas; nor are they solids or liquids; they are most similar to dusty plasmas with small clusters in a gas. Though Rydberg matter can be studied in the laboratory by laser probing, the largest cluster reported consists of only 91 atoms, but it has been shown to be behind extended clouds in space and the upper atmosphere of planets. Bonding in Rydberg matter is caused by delocalisation of the high-energy electrons to form an overall lower energy state. The way in which the electrons delocalise is to form standing waves on loops surrounding nuclei, creating quantised angular momentum and the defining characteristics of Rydberg matter. It is a generalised metal by way of the quantum numbers influencing loop size but restricted by the bonding requirement for strong electron correlation; it shows exchange-correlation properties similar to covalent bonding. Electronic excitation and vibrational motion of these bonds can be studied by Raman spectroscopy.

== Lifetime ==
Schematic of an effective potential within a Wigner–Seitz cell of a Rydberg matter made of excited (n = 10) Cs atoms

Due to reasons still debated by the physics community because of the lack of methods to observe clusters, Rydberg matter is highly stable against disintegration by emission of radiation; the characteristic lifetime of a cluster at n = 12 is 25 seconds. Reasons given include the lack of overlap between excited and ground states, the forbidding of transitions between them and exchange-correlation effects hindering emission through necessitating tunnelling that causes a long delay in excitation decay. Excitation plays a role in determining lifetimes, with a higher excitation giving a longer lifetime; n = 80 gives a lifetime comparable to the age of the Universe.

== Excitations ==
n	d (nm)	D (cm^{−3})
1	0.153	2.8×10^{23}
4	2.45	
5	3.84	
6	5.52	
10	15.3	2.8×10^{17}
40	245	
80	983	
100	1534	2.8×10^{11}

In ordinary metals, interatomic distances are nearly constant through a wide range of temperatures and pressures; this is not the case with Rydberg matter, whose distances and thus properties vary greatly with excitations. A key variable in determining these properties is the principal quantum number n that can be any integer greater than 1; the highest values reported for it are around 100. Bond distance d in Rydberg matter is given by

$$d = 2.9 n^2 a_0,$$

where a_{0} is the Bohr radius. The approximate factor 2.9 was first experimentally determined, then measured with rotational spectroscopy in different clusters. Examples of d calculated this way, along with selected values of the density D, are given in the adjacent table.

== Condensation ==
Like bosons that can be condensed to form Bose–Einstein condensates, Rydberg matter can be condensed, but not in the same way as bosons. The reason for this is that Rydberg matter behaves similarly to a gas, meaning that it cannot be condensed without removing the condensation energy; ionisation occurs if this is not done. All solutions to this problem so far involve using an adjacent surface in some way, the best being evaporating the atoms of which the Rydberg matter is to be formed from and leaving the condensation energy on the surface. Using caesium atoms, graphite-covered surfaces and thermionic converters as containment, the work function of the surface has been measured to be 0.5 eV, indicating that the cluster is between the ninth and fourteenth excitation levels.

== See also ==
The overview provides information on Rydberg matter and possible applications in developing clean energy, catalysts, researching space phenomena, and usage in sensors.

- State of matter

== Disputed ==
The research claiming to create ultradense hydrogen Rydberg matter (with interatomic spacing of ~2.3 pm: many orders of magnitude less than in most solid matter) is disputed:

″The paper of Holmlid and Zeiner-Gundersen makes claims that would be truly revolutionary if they were true. We have shown that they violate some fundamental and very well established laws in a rather direct manner. We believe we share this scepticism with most of the scientific community. The response to the theories of Holmlid is perhaps most clearly reflected in the reference list of their article. Out of 114 references, 36 are not coauthored by Holmlid. And of these 36, none address the claims made by him and his co-authors. This is so much more remarkable because the claims, if correct, would revolutionize quantum science, add at least two new forms of hydrogen, of which one is supposedly the ground state of the element, discover an extremely dense form of matter, discover processes that violate baryon number conservation, in addition to solving humanity's need for energy practically in perpetuity.″
