= Principal quantum number =

Number assigned to each electron shell in an atom

In quantum mechanics, the principal quantum number (n) of an electron in an atom indicates which electron shell or energy level it is in. Its values are natural numbers (1, 2, 3, ...).

Hydrogen and Helium, at their lowest energies, have just one electron shell. Lithium through Neon (see periodic table) have two shells: two electrons in the first shell, and up to 8 in the second shell. Larger atoms have more shells.

The principal quantum number is one of four quantum numbers assigned to each electron in an atom to describe the quantum state of the electron. The other quantum numbers for bound electrons are the total angular momentum of the orbit ℓ, the angular momentum in the z direction ℓ_{z}, and the spin s of the electron.

== Overview and history ==
As n increases, the electron is also at a higher energy and is, therefore, less tightly bound to the nucleus. For higher n, the electron is farther from the nucleus, on average. For each value of n, there are n accepted ℓ (azimuthal) values ranging from 0 to n − 1 inclusively; hence, higher-n electron states are more numerous. Accounting for two states of spin, each n-shell can accommodate up to 2n^{2} electrons.

In a simplistic one-electron model described below, the total energy of an electron is a negative inverse quadratic function of the principal quantum number n, leading to degenerate energy levels for each n > 1. In more complex systems—those having forces other than the nucleus–electron Coulomb force—these levels split. For multielectron atoms this splitting results in "subshells" parametrized by ℓ. Description of energy levels based on n alone gradually becomes inadequate for atomic numbers starting from 5 (boron) and fails completely on potassium (Z = 19) and afterwards.

The principal quantum number was first created for use in the semiclassical Bohr model of the atom, distinguishing between different energy levels. With the development of modern quantum mechanics, the simple Bohr model was replaced with a more complex theory of atomic orbitals. However, the modern theory still requires the principal quantum number.

== Derivation ==
There is a set of quantum numbers associated with the energy states of the atom. The four quantum numbers n, ℓ, m, and s specify the complete and unique quantum state of a single electron in an atom, called its wave function or orbital. Two electrons belonging to the same atom cannot have the same values for all four quantum numbers, due to the Pauli exclusion principle. The Schrödinger wave equation reduces to the three equations that when solved lead to the first three quantum numbers. Therefore, the equations for the first three quantum numbers are all interrelated. The principal quantum number arose in the solution of the radial part of the wave equation as shown below.

The Schrödinger wave equation describes energy eigenstates with corresponding real numbers E_{n} and a definite total energy, the value of E_{n}. The bound state energies of the electron in the hydrogen atom are given by:
$$E_n = \frac {E_1}{n^2} = \frac {-13.6\text{ eV}}{n^2}, \quad n=1,2,3,\ldots$$
The parameter n can take only positive integer values. The concept of energy levels and notation were taken from the earlier Bohr model of the atom. Schrödinger's equation developed the idea from a flat two-dimensional Bohr atom to the three-dimensional wavefunction model.

In the Bohr model, the allowed orbits were derived from quantized (discrete) values of orbital angular momentum, L according to the equation
$$L = n \cdot \hbar = n \cdot {h \over 2\pi}$$
where n = 1, 2, 3, ... and is called the principal quantum number, and ħ is the reduced Planck constant. This formula is not correct in quantum mechanics as the angular momentum magnitude is described by the azimuthal quantum number, but the energy levels are accurate and classically they correspond to the sum of potential and kinetic energy of the electron.

The principal quantum number n represents the relative overall energy of each orbital. The energy level of each orbital increases as its distance from the nucleus increases. The sets of orbitals with the same n value are often referred to as an electron shell.

The minimum energy exchanged during any wave–matter interaction is the product of the wave frequency multiplied by the Planck constant. This causes the wave to display particle-like packets of energy called quanta. The difference between energy levels that have different n determine the emission spectrum of the element.

In the notation of the periodic table, the main shells of electrons are labeled:

K (n = 1), L (n = 2), M (n = 3), etc.

based on the principal quantum number.

The principal quantum number is related to the radial quantum number, n_{r}, by:
$$n = n_r + \ell + 1 ,$$
where ℓ is the azimuthal quantum number and n_{r} is equal to the number of nodes in the radial wavefunction.

The definite total energy for a particle motion in a common Coulomb field and with a discrete spectrum, is given by:
$$E_n = - \frac{Z^2 \hbar^2}{2 m_0 a_0^2 n^2} = -\frac {Z^2 e^4 m_0}{2 \hbar^2 n^2} ,$$
where $a_0$ is the Bohr radius.

This discrete energy spectrum resulted from the solution of the quantum mechanical problem on the electron motion in the Coulomb field, coincides with the spectrum that was obtained with the help application of the Bohr–Sommerfeld quantization rules to the classical equations. The radial quantum number determines the number of nodes of the radial wave function R(r).

== Values ==
In chemistry, values n = 1, 2, 3, 4, 5, 6, 7 (derived from Bohr's electronic configuration arrangement equation 2n²) are used in relation to the electron shell theory, with expected inclusion of n = 8 (and possibly 9) for yet-undiscovered period 8 elements. In atomic physics, higher n sometimes occur for description of excited states. Observations of the interstellar medium reveal atomic hydrogen spectral lines involving n on order of hundreds; values up to 766 were detected.

== See also ==
- Introduction to quantum mechanics
