= Coulomb wave function =

In physics, solution to Schrödinger equation

Irregular Coulomb wave function G plotted from 0 to 20 with repulsive and attractive interactions in Mathematica 13.1

image of complex plot of regular Coulomb wave function added

In mathematics, a Coulomb wave function is a solution of the Coulomb wave equation, named after Charles-Augustin de Coulomb. They are used to describe the behavior of charged particles in a Coulomb potential and can be written in terms of confluent hypergeometric functions or Whittaker functions of imaginary argument.

== Coulomb wave equation ==
The Coulomb wave equation for a single charged particle of mass $m$ is the Schrödinger equation with Coulomb potential

$$\left(-\hbar^2\frac{\nabla^2}{2m}+\frac{Z \hbar c \alpha}{r}\right) \psi_{\vec{k}}(\vec{r}) = \frac{\hbar^2k^2}{2m} \psi_{\vec{k}}(\vec{r}) \,,$$

where $Z=Z_1 Z_2$ is the product of the charges of the particle and of the field source (in units of the elementary charge, $Z=-1$ for the hydrogen atom), $\alpha$ is the fine-structure constant, and $\hbar^2k^2/(2m)$ is the energy of the particle. The solution, which is the Coulomb wave function, can be found by solving this equation in parabolic coordinates

$$\xi= r + \vec{r}\cdot\hat{k}, \quad \zeta= r - \vec{r}\cdot\hat{k} \qquad (\hat{k} = \vec{k}/k) \,.$$

Depending on the boundary conditions chosen, the solution has different forms. Two of the solutions are

$$\psi_{\vec{k}}^{(\pm)}(\vec{r}) = \Gamma(1\pm i\eta) e^{-\pi\eta/2} e^{i\vec{k}\cdot\vec{r}} M(\mp i\eta, 1, \pm ikr - i\vec{k}\cdot\vec{r}) \,,$$

where $M(a,b,z) \equiv {}_1\!F_1(a;b;z)$ is the confluent hypergeometric function, $\eta = Zmc\alpha/(\hbar k)$ and $\Gamma(z)$ is the gamma function. The two boundary conditions used here are

$$\psi_{\vec{k}}^{(\pm)}(\vec{r}) \rightarrow e^{i\vec{k}\cdot\vec{r}} \qquad (\vec{k}\cdot\vec{r} \rightarrow \pm\infty) \,,$$

which correspond to $\vec{k}$-oriented plane-wave asymptotic states before or after its approach of the field source at the origin, respectively. The functions $\psi_{\vec{k}}^{(\pm)}$ are related to each other by the formula

$$\psi_{\vec{k}}^{(+)} = \psi_{-\vec{k}}^{(-)*} \,.$$

=== Partial wave expansion ===
The wave function $\psi_{\vec{k}}(\vec{r})$ can be expanded into partial waves (i.e. with respect to the angular basis) to obtain angle-independent radial functions $w_\ell(\eta,\rho)$. Here $\rho=kr$.

$$\psi_{\vec{k}}(\vec{r}) = \frac{4\pi}{r} \sum_{\ell=0}^\infty \sum_{m=-\ell}^\ell i^\ell w_{\ell}(\eta,\rho) Y_\ell^m (\hat{r}) Y_{\ell}^{m\ast} (\hat{k}) \,.$$

A single term of the expansion can be isolated by the scalar product with a specific spherical harmonic

$$\psi_{k\ell m}(\vec{r}) = \int \psi_{\vec{k}}(\vec{r}) Y_\ell^m (\hat{k}) d\hat{k} = R_{k\ell}(r) Y_\ell^m(\hat{r}), \qquad R_{k\ell}(r) = 4\pi i^\ell w_\ell(\eta,\rho)/r.$$

The equation for single partial wave $w_\ell(\eta,\rho)$ can be obtained by rewriting the laplacian in the Coulomb wave equation in spherical coordinates and projecting the equation on a specific spherical harmonic $Y_\ell^m(\hat{r})$

$$\frac{d^2 w_\ell}{d\rho^2}+\left(1-\frac{2\eta}{\rho}-\frac{\ell(\ell+1)}{\rho^2}\right)w_\ell=0 \,.$$

The solutions are also called Coulomb (partial) wave functions or spherical Coulomb functions. Putting $z=-2i\rho$ changes the Coulomb wave equation into the Whittaker equation, so Coulomb wave functions can be expressed in terms of Whittaker functions with imaginary arguments $M_{-i\eta,\ell+1/2}(-2i\rho)$ and $W_{-i\eta,\ell+1/2}(-2i\rho)$. The latter can be expressed in terms of the confluent hypergeometric functions $M$ and $U$. For $\ell\in\mathbb{Z}$, one defines the special solutions

$$H_\ell^{(\pm)}(\eta,\rho) = \mp 2i(-2)^{\ell}e^{\pi\eta/2} e^{\pm i \sigma_\ell}\rho^{\ell+1}e^{\pm i\rho}U(\ell+1\pm i\eta,2\ell+2,\mp 2i\rho) \,,$$

where

$$\sigma_\ell = \arg \Gamma(\ell+1+i \eta)$$

is called the Coulomb phase shift. One also defines the real functions

$$F_\ell(\eta,\rho) = \frac{1}{2i} \left(H_\ell^{(+)}(\eta,\rho)-H_\ell^{(-)}(\eta,\rho) \right) \,,$$

Regular Coulomb wave function F plotted from 0 to 20 with repulsive and attractive interactions in Mathematica 13.1

$G_\ell(\eta,\rho) = \frac{1}{2} \left(H_\ell^{(+)}(\eta,\rho)+H_\ell^{(-)}(\eta,\rho) \right) \,.$

In particular one has

$$F_\ell(\eta,\rho) = \frac{2^\ell e^{-\pi\eta/2}|\Gamma(\ell+1+i\eta)|}{(2\ell+1)!}\rho^{\ell+1}e^{i\rho}M(\ell+1+i\eta,2\ell+2,-2i\rho) \,.$$

The asymptotic behavior of the spherical Coulomb functions $H_\ell^{(\pm)}(\eta,\rho)$, $F_\ell(\eta,\rho)$, and $G_\ell(\eta,\rho)$ at large $\rho$ is

$$H_\ell^{(\pm)}(\eta,\rho) \sim e^{\pm i \theta_\ell(\rho)} \,,$$
$$F_\ell(\eta,\rho) \sim \sin \theta_\ell(\rho) \,,$$
$$G_\ell(\eta,\rho) \sim \cos \theta_\ell(\rho) \,,$$

where

$$\theta_\ell(\rho) = \rho - \eta \log(2\rho) -\frac{1}{2} \ell \pi + \sigma_\ell \,.$$

The solutions $H_\ell^{(\pm)}(\eta,\rho)$ correspond to incoming and outgoing spherical waves. The solutions $F_\ell(\eta,\rho)$ and $G_\ell(\eta,\rho)$ are real and are called the regular and irregular Coulomb wave functions. In particular one has the following partial wave expansion for the wave function $\psi_{\vec{k}}^{(+)}(\vec{r})$

$$\psi_{\vec{k}}^{(+)}(\vec{r}) = \frac{4\pi}{\rho} \sum_{\ell=0}^\infty \sum_{m=-\ell}^\ell i^\ell e^{i \sigma_\ell} F_\ell(\eta,\rho)  Y_\ell^m (\hat{r}) Y_{\ell}^{m\ast} (\hat{k}) \,,$$

In the limit $\eta\to 0$ regular/irregular Coulomb wave functions $F_\ell(\eta,\rho)$,$G_\ell(\eta,\rho)$ are proportional to Spherical Bessel functions and spherical Coulomb functions $H^{(\pm)}_\ell(\eta,\rho)$ are proportional to Spherical Hankel functions

$$F_\ell(0,\rho)/\rho =   j_\ell(\rho)$$
$$G_\ell(0,\rho)/\rho = - y_\ell(\rho)$$
$$H^{(+)}_\ell(0,\rho)/\rho = i\, h^{(1)}_\ell(\rho)$$
$$H^{(-)}_\ell(0,\rho)/\rho =-i\, h^{(2)}_\ell(\rho)$$

and are normalized same as Spherical Bessel functions

$$\int\limits_0^\infty j_l(k\, r) j_l(k' r)\,r^2 dr = \int\limits_0^\infty \frac{F_\ell\left(\pm \frac{1}{a_0 k},k\, r\right)}{k\, r} \frac{F_\ell\left(\pm \frac{1}{a_0 k'}, k' r\right)}{k' r} \, r^2 d r = \frac{\pi}{2 k^2}\delta(k-k')$$

and similar for other 3.

== Properties of the Coulomb function ==
The radial parts for a given angular momentum are orthonormal. When normalized on the wave number scale (k-scale), the continuum radial wave functions satisfy

$$\int_0^\infty R_{k\ell}^\ast(r) R_{k'\ell}(r) r^2 dr = \delta(k-k')$$

Other common normalizations of continuum wave functions are on the reduced wave number scale ($k/2\pi$-scale),

$$\int_0^\infty R_{k\ell}^\ast(r) R_{k'\ell}(r) r^2 dr = 2\pi \delta(k-k') \,,$$

and on the energy scale

$$\int_0^\infty R_{E\ell}^\ast(r) R_{E'\ell}(r) r^2 dr = \delta(E-E') \,.$$

The radial wave functions defined in the previous section are normalized to

$$\int_0^\infty R_{k\ell}^\ast(r) R_{k'\ell}(r) r^2 dr = \frac{(2\pi)^3}{k^2} \delta(k-k')$$

as a consequence of the normalization

$$\int \psi^{\ast}_{\vec{k}}(\vec{r}) \psi_{\vec{k}'}(\vec{r}) d^3r = (2\pi)^3 \delta(\vec{k}-\vec{k}') \,.$$

The continuum (or scattering) Coulomb wave functions are also orthogonal to all Coulomb bound states

$$\int_0^\infty R_{k\ell}^\ast(r) R_{n\ell}(r) r^2 dr = 0$$

due to being eigenstates of the same hermitian operator (the hamiltonian) with different eigenvalues.
