= Denisyuk =

Denisyuk or Denysyuk (Ukrainian: Денисюк) is a Ukrainian patronymic surname derived from the given name Denys. Notable people with the surname include:

- Iryna Chuzhynova-Denysyuk, Ukrainian cyclist
- Yuri Denisyuk, Russian physicist

== See also ==
- Denisyuk polynomials
