= Angelescu =

Angelescu may refer to:

- Constantin Angelescu (1870–1948), a Romanian politician
- Emil Angelescu, a Romanian bobsledder
- Angelescu polynomials, in mathematics, generalizations of the Laguerre polynomials introduced by Angelescu (1938) given by the generating function
