= Toronto function =

In mathematics, the Toronto function is a modification of the confluent hypergeometric function defined by A. H. Heatley as

$$T(m,n,r)=r^{2n-m+1}e^{-r^2}\frac{\Gamma\big(\frac 1{2}m+\frac 1{2}\big)}{\Gamma(n+1)}{}_1F_1\big({\textstyle\frac 1{2}}m+{\textstyle\frac 1{2}};n+1;r^2\big),$$

where $\Gamma$ is the gamma function and $_1F_1$ is a confluent hypergeometric function of the first kind.

The Toronto function has appeared in a study on the theory of turbulence.
