= Thomas Henry Havelock =

English mathematician

Sir Thomas Henry Havelock FRS (24 June 1877 – 1 August 1968) was an English applied mathematician, hydrodynamicist and mathematical physicist. He is known for Havelock's law (1907).

Havelock was born in Newcastle upon Tyne. At the age of sixteen, he entered Durham College of Physical Science. (Durham College of Physical Science was renamed Armstrong College in 1904.) He matriculated in 1897 at St John's College, Cambridge and graduated there B.A. in 1900 and M.A. in 1904. From 1903 to 1909 he was a Fellow of St John's College, Cambridge. He was a professor of applied mathematics at Armstrong College from 1914 until his retirement in 1945. (In the 1930s Armstrong College became part of King's College, Durham, which in the 1960s became part of Newcastle University.)

== Havelock's law ==
Relationship between the refractive index $n$ and the wavelength $\lambda$ of a homogeneous material that transmits light:

$k = B \ \lambda$ $n$$/{(n-1)^2}$, where

$k$ = constant for the material at a given temperature
$B$ = Kerr constant of the material (The Kerr constant is approximately proportional to the absolute temperature.)
$\lambda$ = wavelength of the material
$n$ = refractive index of the material

== Awards and honours ==
- 1914 – F.R.S.
- 1956 – William Froude Gold Medal of the Royal Institution of Naval Architects
- 1957 – Knighthood
- 1960 - Honorary doctorate from the University of Hamburg

== Selected publications ==
- Havelock, T. H. (1908). "The propagation of groups of waves in dispersive media, with application to waves on water produced by a travelling disturbance". Proceedings of the Royal Society of London. Series A, Containing Papers of a Mathematical and Physical Character. 81 (549): 398–430. Bibcode:1908RSPSA..81..398H. doi:10.1098/rspa.1908.0097. JSTOR 93014.
- Propagation of disturbances in dispersive media. Cambridge tracts in mathematics and mathematical physics; no. 17. Cambridge University Press. 1914.
- Havelock, T. H. (1917). "Some cases of wave motion due to a submerged obstacle". Proceedings of the Royal Society of London. Series A, Containing Papers of a Mathematical and Physical Character. 93 (654): 520–532. Bibcode:1917RSPSA..93..520H. doi:10.1098/rspa.1917.0036. JSTOR 93671.
- Havelock, T. H. (1918). "Periodic irrotational waves of finite height. Proceedings of the Royal Society of London. Series A, Containing Papers of a Mathematical and Physical Character". Proceedings of the Royal Society A: Mathematical, Physical and Engineering Sciences. 95 (665): 38–51. doi:10.1098/rspa.1918.0046. JSTOR 93648.
- Havelock, T.H. (1929). "LIX. Forced surface-waves on water". The London, Edinburgh, and Dublin Philosophical Magazine and Journal of Science. 8 (51): 569–576. doi:10.1080/14786441008564913.
- Havelock, T.H. (1931). "LII. the stability of motion of rectilinear vortices in ring formation". The London, Edinburgh, and Dublin Philosophical Magazine and Journal of Science. 11 (70): 617–633. doi:10.1080/14786443109461714.
- Havelock, T. H. (1931). "The wave resistance of a spheroid. Proceedings of the Royal Society of London. Series A, Containing Papers of a Mathematical and Physical Character". Proceedings of the Royal Society A: Mathematical, Physical and Engineering Sciences. 131 (817): 275–285. doi:10.1098/rspa.1931.0052. JSTOR 95604.
- Havelock, T. H. (1934). "The calculation of wave resistance". Proceedings of the Royal Society of London. Series A, Containing Papers of a Mathematical and Physical Character. 144 (853): 514–521. Bibcode:1934RSPSA.144..514H. doi:10.1098/rspa.1934.0065. JSTOR 2935541.
- Havelock, T. H. (July 1940). "The pressure of water waves upon a fixed obstacle". Proceedings of the Royal Society of London A: Mathematical, Physical and Engineering Sciences. 175 (963): 409–421. Bibcode:1940RSPSA.175..409H. doi:10.1098/rspa.1940.0066. S2CID 123137569.
- Havelock, T.H. (1942). "XLVII. The drifting force on a ship among waves". The London, Edinburgh, and Dublin Philosophical Magazine and Journal of Science. 33 (221): 467–475. doi:10.1080/14786444208521213.
- Havelock, T.H. (1942). "LXXI. The damping of the heaving and pitching motion of a ship". The London, Edinburgh, and Dublin Philosophical Magazine and Journal of Science. 33 (224): 666–673. doi:10.1080/14786444208521218.

== See also ==
- Havelock function
