= Bateman function =

In mathematics, the Bateman function (or k-function) is a special case of the confluent hypergeometric function studied by Harry Bateman(1931). Bateman defined it by

$$\displaystyle k_\nu(x) = \frac{2}{\pi}\int_0^{\pi/2}\cos(x\tan\theta-\nu\theta) \, d\theta .$$

Bateman discovered this function, when Theodore von Kármán asked for the solution of the following differential equation which appeared in the theory of turbulence

$$x \frac{d^2u}{dx^2} = (x-\nu) u$$

and Bateman found this function as one of the solutions. Bateman denoted this function as "k" function in honor of Theodore von Kármán.

The Bateman function for $x>0$ is the related to the Confluent hypergeometric function of the second kind as follows

$$k_{\nu}(x)=\frac{e^{-x}}{\Gamma\left(1+\frac{1}{2}\nu\right)} U\left(-\frac{1}{2}\nu,0,2x\right), \quad x>0.$$

This is not to be confused with another function of the same name which is used in Pharmacokinetics.

== Havelock function ==
Complementary to the Bateman function, one may also define the Havelock function, named after Thomas Henry Havelock. In fact, both the Bateman and the Havelock functions were first introduced by Havelock in 1927, while investigating the surface elevation of the uniform stream past an immersed circular cylinder. The Havelock function is defined by

$$\displaystyle h_\nu(x) = \frac{2}{\pi}\int_0^{\pi/2}\sin(x\tan\theta-\nu\theta) \, d\theta .$$

== Properties ==
- $k_0(x) = e^{-|x|}$
- $k_{-n}(x) = k_n(-x)$
- $k_n(0)=\frac{2}{n\pi} \sin \frac{n\pi}{2}$
- $k_2(x)=(x+|x|) e^{-|x|}$
- $|k_n(x)|\leq 1$ for real values of $n$ and $x$
- $k_{2n}(x)=0$ for $x<0$ if $n$ is a positive integer
- $k_1(x) = \frac{2x}{\pi} [K_1(x) + K_0(x)], \ x<0$, where $K_n(-x)$ is the Modified Bessel function of the second kind
