= Cunningham function =

In statistics, the Cunningham function or Pearson–Cunningham function ω_{m,n}(x) is a generalisation of a special function introduced by Pearson (1906) and studied in the form here by Cunningham (1908). It can be defined in terms of the confluent hypergeometric function U, by

$$\displaystyle \omega_{m,n}(x) = \frac{e^{-x+\pi i (m/2-n)}}{\Gamma(1+n-m/2)}U(m/2-n,1+m,x).$$

The function was studied by Cunningham in the context of a multivariate generalisation of the Edgeworth expansion for approximating a probability density function based on its (joint) moments. In a more general context, the function is related to the solution of the constant-coefficient diffusion equation, in one or more dimensions.

The function ω_{m,n}(x) is a solution of the differential equation for X:

$$xX''+(x+1+m)X'+(n+\tfrac{1}{2}m+1)X.$$

The special function studied by Pearson is given, in his notation by,

$$\omega_{2n}(x) =\omega_{0,n}(x).$$
