= Denisyuk polynomials =

In mathematics, Denisyuk polynomials De_{n}(x) or M_{n}(x) are generalizations of the Laguerre polynomials introduced by Denisyuk (1954) given by the generating function

$$\displaystyle \sum_{n=0}^\infty t^nM_n(x)=\frac 1{1+t}\exp\left(-\frac{xt}{1-t}\right).$$
