= Whittaker function =

In mathematics, a solution to a modified form of the confluent hypergeometric equation

Plot of the Whittaker function M k,m(z) with k=2 and m=1/2 in the complex plane from -2-2i to 2+2i with colors created with Mathematica 13.1 function ComplexPlot3D

In mathematics, a Whittaker function is a special solution of Whittaker's equation, a modified form of the confluent hypergeometric equation introduced by Whittaker (1903) to make the formulas involving the solutions more symmetric. More generally, Jacquet (1966, 1967) introduced Whittaker functions of reductive groups over local fields, where the functions studied by Whittaker are essentially the case where the local field is the real numbers and the group is SL_{2}(R).

Whittaker's equation is

$$\frac{d^2w}{dz^2}+\left(-\frac{1}{4}+\frac{\kappa}{z}+\frac{1/4-\mu^2}{z^2}\right)w=0.$$

It has a regular singular point at 0 and an irregular singular point at ∞. Two solutions are given by the Whittaker functions M_{κ,μ}(z), W_{κ,μ}(z), defined in terms of Kummer's confluent hypergeometric functions M and U by

$$M_{\kappa,\mu}\left(z\right) = \exp\left(-z/2\right)z^{\mu+\tfrac{1}{2}}M\left(\mu-\kappa+\tfrac{1}{2}, 1+2\mu, z\right)$$
$$W_{\kappa,\mu}\left(z\right) = \exp\left(-z/2\right)z^{\mu+\tfrac{1}{2}}U\left(\mu-\kappa+\tfrac{1}{2}, 1+2\mu, z\right).$$

The Whittaker function $W_{\kappa,\mu}(z)$ is the same as those with opposite values of μ, in other words considered as a function of μ at fixed κ and z it is even functions. When κ and z are real, the functions give real values for real and imaginary values of μ. These functions of μ play a role in so-called Kummer spaces.

Whittaker functions appear as coefficients of certain representations of the group SL_{2}(R), called Whittaker models.
