= Angelescu polynomials =

Polynomial sequence

In mathematics, the Angelescu polynomials π_{n}(x) are a series of polynomials generalizing the Laguerre polynomials introduced by Aurel Angelescu. The polynomials can be given by the generating function$\phi\left(\frac t{1-t}\right)\exp\left(-\frac{xt}{1-t}\right)=\sum_{n=0}^\infty\pi_n(x)t^n.$

They can also be defined by the equation $\pi_{n}(x) := e^x D^n[e^{-x}A_n(x)],$where $\frac{A_n(x)}{n!}$ is an Appell set of polynomials.

== Properties ==
=== Addition and recurrence relations ===
The Angelescu polynomials satisfy the following addition theorem:

$(-1)^n\sum_{r=0}^m\frac{L_{m+n-r}^{(n)}(x)\pi_r(y)}{(n+m-r)!r!} = \sum_{r=0}^m (-1)^r\binom{-n-1}{r} \frac{\pi_{n-r}(x+y)}{(m-r)!},$where $L^{(n)}_{m+n-r}$ is a generalized Laguerre polynomial.

A particularly notable special case of this is when $n=0$, in which case the formula simplifies to$\frac{\pi_m(x+y)}{m!} = \sum_{r=0}^m \frac{L_{m-r}(x)\pi_r(y)}{(m-r)!r!} - \sum_{r=0}^{m-1} \frac{L_{m-r-1}(x)\pi_r(y)}{(m-r-1)!r!}.$

The polynomials also satisfy the recurrence relation

$\pi_s(x) = \sum_{r=0}^n (-1)^{n+r}\binom{n}{r}\frac{s!}{(n+s-r)!}\frac{d^n}{dx^n}[\pi_{n+s-r}(x)],$

which simplifies when $n=0$ to $\pi'_{s+1}(x) = (s+1)[\pi'_s(x) - \pi_s(x)]$. This can be generalized to the following:

$-\sum_{r=0}^s \frac{1}{(m+n-r-1)!}L^{(m+n-1)}_{m+n-r-1}(x)\frac{\pi_{r-s}(y)}{(s-r)!} = \frac{1}{(m+n+s)!}\frac{d^{m+n}}{dx^m dy^n}\pi_{m+n+s}(x+y),$

a special case of which is the formula $\frac{d^{m+n}}{dx^m dy^n}\pi_{m+n}(x+y) = (-1)^{m+n} (m+n)! a_0$.

=== Integrals ===
The Angelescu polynomials satisfy the following integral formulae:

$$\begin{align}
\int_0^{\infty}\frac{e^{-x/2}}{x}[\pi_n(x) - \pi_n(0)]dx &= \sum_{r=0}^{n-1} (-1)^{n-r+1}\frac{n!}{r!}\pi_r(0)\int_0^{\infty} [\frac{1}{1/2 + p} - 1]^{n-r-1} d[\frac{1}{1/2+p}]\\
&= \sum_{r=0}^{n-1} (-1)^{n-r+1}\frac{n!}{r!}\frac{\pi_r(0)}{n-r}[1 + (-1)^{n-r-1}]
\end{align}$$

$$\int_0^{\infty} e^{-x}[\pi_n(x) - \pi_n(0)]L_m^{(1)}(x)dx = \begin{cases}
0\text{ if }m\geq n\\
\frac{n!}{(n-m-1)!}\pi_{n-m-1}(0)\text{ if }0\leq m\leq n-1
\end{cases}$$

(Here, $L_m^{(1)}(x)$ is a Laguerre polynomial.)

== Further generalization ==
We can define a q-analog of the Angelescu polynomials as $\pi_{n, q}(x) := e_q(xq^n) D_q^n[E_q(-x)P_n(x)]$, where $e_q$ and $E_q$ are the q-exponential functions $e_q(x) := \Pi_{n=0}^{\infty} (1 - q^n x)^{-1} = \Sigma_{k=0}^{\infty}\frac{x^k}{[k]!}$ and $E_q(x) := \Pi_{n=0}^{\infty} (1 + q^n x) = \Sigma_{k=0}^{\infty}\frac{q^{\frac{k(k-1)}{2}}x^k}{[k]!}$, $D_q$ is the q-derivative, and $P_n$ is a "q-Appell set" (satisfying the property $D_q P_n(x) = [n]P_{n-1}(x)$).

This q-analog can also be given as a generating function as well:

$\sum_{n=0}^{\infty}\frac{\pi_{n, q}(x)t^n}{(1;n)} = \sum_{n=0}^{\infty}\frac{(-1)^n q^{\frac{n(n-1)}{2}}t^n P_n(x)}{(1;n)[1-t]_{n+1}},$where we employ the notation $(a;k) := (1 - q^a)\dots (1 - q^{a+k-1})$ and
$$[a+b]_n = \sum_{k=0}^n\begin{bmatrix}n\\k\end{bmatrix}a^{n-k}b^k$$.
