= Electron configuration =

Mode of arrangement of electrons in different shells of an atom

Electron atomic and molecular orbitals

A Bohr diagram of lithium

In atomic physics and quantum chemistry, the electron configuration is the distribution of electrons of an atom or molecule (or other physical structure) in atomic or molecular orbitals. For example, the electron configuration of the neon atom is 1s^{2} 2s^{2} 2p^{6}, meaning that the 1s, 2s, and 2p subshells are occupied by two, two, and six electrons, respectively.

Electronic configurations describe each electron as moving independently in an orbital, in an average field created by the nuclei and all the other electrons. Mathematically, configurations are described by Slater determinants or configuration state functions.

According to the laws of quantum mechanics, a level of energy is associated with each electron configuration. In certain conditions, electrons are able to move from one configuration to another by the emission or absorption of a quantum of energy, in the form of a photon.

Knowledge of the electron configuration of different atoms is useful in understanding the structure of the periodic table of elements, for describing the chemical bonds that hold atoms together, and in understanding the chemical formulas of compounds and the geometries of molecules. In bulk materials, this same idea helps explain the peculiar properties of lasers and semiconductors.

== Shells and subshells ==
	s (l = 0)	p (l = 1)		
	m = 0	m = 0	m = ±1	
	s	p_{z}	p_{x}	p_{y}
n = 1				
n = 2				

Electron configuration was first conceived under the Bohr model of the atom, and it is still common to speak of shells and subshells despite the advances in understanding of the quantum-mechanical nature of electrons.

An electron shell is the set of allowed states that share the same principal quantum number, n, that electrons may occupy. In each term of an electron configuration, n is the positive integer that precedes each orbital letter (e.g. helium's electron configuration is 1s^{2}, therefore n = 1, and the orbital contains two electrons). An atom's nth electron shell can accommodate 2n^{2} electrons. For example, the first shell can accommodate two electrons, the second shell eight electrons, the third shell eighteen, and so on. The factor of two arises due to electron spin. Each atomic orbital admits up to two otherwise identical electrons with opposite spin, one with a spin +1/2 (usually denoted by an up-arrow) and one with a spin of −1/2 (with a down-arrow).

A subshell is the set of states defined by a common azimuthal quantum number, l, within a shell. The value of l is in the range from 0 to n − 1. The values l = 0, 1, 2, 3 correspond to the s, p, d, and f labels, respectively. For example, the 3d subshell has n = 3 and l = 2. The maximum number of electrons that can be placed in a subshell is given by 2(2l + 1). This gives two electrons in an s subshell, six electrons in a p subshell, and ten electrons in a d subshell.

The numbers of electrons that can occupy each shell and each subshell arise from the equations of quantum mechanics, (Note: In formal terms, the quantum numbers n, l and m_{l} arise from the fact that the solutions to the time-independent Schrödinger equation for hydrogen-like atoms are based on spherical harmonics.) in particular the Pauli exclusion principle, which states that no two electrons in the same atom can have the same values of the four quantum numbers.

Exhaustive technical details about the complete quantum mechanical theory of atomic spectra and structure can be found and studied in the basic book of Robert D. Cowan.

== Notation ==
Physicists and chemists use a standard notation to indicate the electron configurations of atoms and molecules. For atoms, the notation consists of a sequence of atomic subshell labels (e.g. for phosphorus the sequence 1s, 2s, 2p, 3s, 3p) with the number of electrons assigned to each subshell placed as a superscript. For example, hydrogen has one electron in the s-orbital of the first shell, so its configuration is written 1s^{1}. Lithium has two electrons in the 1s-subshell and one in the (higher-energy) 2s-subshell, so its configuration is written 1s^{2} 2s^{1} (pronounced "one-s-two, two-s-one"). Phosphorus (atomic number 15) is as follows: 1s^{2} 2s^{2} 2p^{6} 3s^{2} 3p^{3}.

It is quite common to see the letters of the orbital labels (s, p, d, f) written in an italic or slanting typeface, although the International Union of Pure and Applied Chemistry (IUPAC) recommends a normal typeface (as used here). The choice of letters originates from a now-obsolete system of categorizing spectral lines as "sharp", "principal", "diffuse" and "fundamental" (or "fine"), based on their observed fine structure: their modern usage indicates orbitals with an azimuthal quantum number, l, of 0, 1, 2 or 3 respectively. After f, the sequence continues alphabetically g, h, i... (l = 4, 5, 6...), skipping j, although orbitals of these types are rarely required.

The electron configurations of molecules are written in a similar way, except that molecular orbital labels are used instead of atomic orbital labels.

=== Condensed ===
For atoms with many electrons, this notation can become lengthy and so an abbreviated notation is used. The electron configuration can be visualized as the core electrons, equivalent to the noble gas of the preceding period, and the valence electrons: each element in a period differs only by the last few subshells. Phosphorus, for instance, is in the third period. It differs from the second-period neon, whose configuration is 1s^{2} 2s^{2} 2p^{6}, only by the presence of a third shell. The portion of its configuration that is equivalent to neon is abbreviated as [Ne], allowing the configuration of phosphorus to be written as [Ne] 3s^{2} 3p^{3} rather than writing out the details of the configuration of neon explicitly. This convention is useful as it is the electrons in the outermost shell that most determine the chemistry of the element.

Condensed symbols have the following meanings:

Symbol	Meaning
[He]	1s^{2}
[Ne]	[He] 2s^{2} 2p^{6}
[Ar]	[Ne] 3s^{2} 3p^{6}
[Kr]	[Ar] 3d^{10} 4s^{2} 4p^{6}
[Xe]	[Kr] 4d^{10} 5s^{2} 5p^{6}
[Rn]	[Xe] 4f^{14} 5d^{10} 6s^{2} 6p^{6}
[Og]	[Rn] 5f^{14} 6d^{10} 7s^{2} 7p^{6} (predicted)

=== Order ===
For a given configuration, the order of writing the orbitals is not completely fixed since only the orbital occupancies have physical significance. For example, the electron configuration of the titanium ground state can be written as either [Ar] 4s^{2} 3d^{2} or [Ar] 3d^{2} 4s^{2}. The first notation follows the order based on the Madelung rule for the configurations of neutral atoms; 4s is filled before 3d in the sequence Ar, K, Ca, Sc, Ti. The second notation groups all orbitals with the same value of n together, corresponding to the "spectroscopic" order of orbital energies that is the reverse of the order in which electrons are removed from a given atom to form positive ions; 3d is filled before 4s in the sequence Ti^{4+}, Ti^{3+}, Ti^{2+}, Ti^{+}, Ti.

=== Implied Values ===
The superscript 1 for a singly occupied subshell is not compulsory; for example, aluminium may be written as either [Ne] 3s^{2} 3p^{1} or [Ne] 3s^{2} 3p. In atoms where a subshell is unoccupied despite higher subshells being occupied (as is the case in some ions, as well as certain neutral atoms shown to deviate from the Madelung rule), the empty subshell is either denoted with a superscript 0 or left out altogether. For example, neutral palladium may be written as either [Kr] 4d^{10} 5s^{0} or simply [Kr] 4d^{10}, and the lanthanum(III) ion may be written as either [Xe] 4f^{0} or simply [Xe].

== Energy of ground state and excited states ==
The energy associated to an electron is that of its orbital. The energy of a configuration is often approximated as the sum of the energy of each electron, neglecting the electron-electron interactions. The configuration that corresponds to the lowest electronic energy is called the ground state. Any other configuration is an excited state.

As an example, the ground state configuration of the sodium atom is 1s^{2} 2s^{2} 2p^{6} 3s^{1}, as deduced from the Aufbau principle (see below). The first excited state is obtained by promoting a 3s electron to the 3p subshell, to obtain the 1s^{2} 2s^{2} 2p^{6} 3p^{1} configuration, abbreviated as the 3p level. Atoms can move from one configuration to another by absorbing or emitting energy. In a sodium-vapor lamp for example, sodium atoms are excited to the 3p level by an electrical discharge, and return to the ground state by emitting yellow light of wavelength 589 nm.

Usually, the excitation of valence electrons (such as 3s for sodium) involves energies corresponding to photons of visible or ultraviolet light. The excitation of core electrons is possible, but requires much higher energies, generally corresponding to X-ray photons. This would be the case for example to excite a 2p electron of sodium to the 3s level and form the excited 1s^{2} 2s^{2} 2p^{5} 3s^{2} configuration.

The remainder of this article deals only with the ground-state configuration, often referred to as "the" configuration of an atom or molecule.

== History ==
Irving Langmuir was the first to propose in his 1919 article "The Arrangement of Electrons in Atoms and Molecules" in which, building on Gilbert N. Lewis's cubical atom theory and Walther Kossel's chemical bonding theory, he outlined his "concentric theory of atomic structure". Langmuir had developed his work on electron atomic structure from other chemists as is shown in the development of the History of the periodic table and the Octet rule.

Niels Bohr (1923) incorporated Langmuir's model that the periodicity in the properties of the elements might be explained by the electronic structure of the atom. His proposals were based on the then current Bohr model of the atom, in which the electron shells were orbits at a fixed distance from the nucleus. Bohr's original configurations would seem strange to a present-day chemist: sulfur was given as 2.4.4.6 instead of 1s^{2} 2s^{2} 2p^{6} 3s^{2} 3p^{4} (2.8.6). Bohr used 4 and 6 following Alfred Werner's 1893 paper. In fact, the chemists accepted the concept of atoms long before the physicists. Langmuir began his paper referenced above by saying,

«…The problem of the structure of atoms has been attacked mainly by physicists who have given little consideration to the chemical properties which must ultimately be explained by a theory of atomic structure. The vast store of knowledge of chemical properties and relationships, such as is summarized by the Periodic Table, should serve as a better foundation for a theory of atomic structure than the relatively meager experimental data along purely physical lines... These electrons arrange themselves in a series of concentric shells, the first shell containing two electrons, while all other shells tend to hold eight.…»

The valence electrons in the atom were described by Richard Abegg in 1904.

In 1924, E. C. Stoner incorporated Sommerfeld's third quantum number into the description of electron shells, and correctly predicted the shell structure of sulfur to be 2.8.6. However neither Bohr's system nor Stoner's could correctly describe the changes in atomic spectra in a magnetic field (the Zeeman effect).

Bohr was well aware of this shortcoming (and others), and had written to his friend Wolfgang Pauli in 1923 to ask for his help in saving quantum theory (the system now known as "old quantum theory"). Pauli hypothesized successfully that the Zeeman effect can be explained as depending only on the response of the outermost (i.e., valence) electrons of the atom. Pauli was able to reproduce Stoner's shell structure, but with the correct structure of subshells, by his inclusion of a fourth quantum number and his exclusion principle (1925):

It should be forbidden for more than one electron with the same value of the main quantum number n to have the same value for the other three quantum numbers k [l], j [m_{l}] and m [m_{s}].

The Schrödinger equation, published in 1926, gave three of the four quantum numbers as a direct consequence of its solution for the hydrogen atom: this solution yields the atomic orbitals that are shown today in textbooks of chemistry (and above). The examination of atomic spectra allowed the electron configurations of atoms to be determined experimentally, and led to an empirical rule (known as Madelung's rule (1936), see below) for the order in which atomic orbitals are filled with electrons.

== Atoms: Aufbau principle and Madelung rule ==
The aufbau principle (from the German Aufbau, "building up, construction") was an important part of Bohr's original concept of electron configuration. It may be stated as:

a maximum of two electrons are put into orbitals in the order of increasing orbital energy: the lowest-energy subshells are filled before electrons are placed in higher-energy orbitals.

The approximate order of filling of atomic orbitals, following the arrows from 1s to 7p. (After 7p the order includes subshells outside the range of the diagram, starting with 8s.)

The principle works very well (for the ground states of the atoms) for the known 118 elements, although it is sometimes slightly wrong. The modern form of the aufbau principle describes an order of orbital energies given by Madelung's rule (or Klechkowski's rule). This rule was first stated by Charles Janet in 1929, rediscovered by Erwin Madelung in 1936, and later given a theoretical justification by V. M. Klechkowski:

1. Subshells are filled in the order of increasing n + l.
2. Where two subshells have the same value of n + l, they are filled in order of increasing n.

This gives the following order for filling the orbitals:

1s, 2s, 2p, 3s, 3p, 4s, 3d, 4p, 5s, 4d, 5p, 6s, 4f, 5d, 6p, 7s, 5f, 6d, 7p, (8s, 5g, 6f, 7d, 8p, and 9s)

In this list the subshells in parentheses are not occupied in the ground state of the heaviest atom now known (Og, Z = 118).

The aufbau principle can be applied, in a modified form, to the protons and neutrons in the atomic nucleus, as in the shell model of nuclear physics and nuclear chemistry.

=== Periodic table ===
Electron configuration table showing blocks.

The form of the periodic table is closely related to the atomic electron configuration for each element. For example, all the elements of group 2 (the table's second column) have an electron configuration of [E] ns^{2} (where [E] is a noble gas configuration), and have notable similarities in their chemical properties. The periodicity of the periodic table in terms of periodic table blocks is due to the number of electrons (2, 6, 10, and 14) needed to fill s, p, d, and f subshells. These blocks appear as the rectangular sections of the periodic table. The single exception is helium, which despite being an s-block atom is conventionally placed with the other noble gases in the p-block due to its chemical inertness, a consequence of its full outer shell (though there is discussion in the contemporary literature on whether this exception should be retained).

The electrons in the valence (outermost) shell largely determine each element's chemical properties. The similarities in the chemical properties were remarked on more than a century before the idea of electron configuration. (Note: The similarities in chemical properties and the numerical relationship between the atomic weights of calcium, strontium and barium was first noted by Johann Wolfgang Döbereiner in 1817.)

=== Ionization of the transition metals ===
An apparent paradox arises when electrons are removed from the transition metal atoms to form ions. The first electrons to be ionized come not from the 3d-orbital, as one would expect if it were "higher in energy", but from the 4s-orbital. This interchange of electrons between 4s and 3d is found for all atoms of the first series of transition metals. (Note: There are some cases in the second and third series where the electron remains in an s-orbital.) The configurations of the neutral atoms (K, Ca, Sc, Ti, V, Cr, ...) usually follow the order 1s, 2s, 2p, 3s, 3p, 4s, 3d, ...; however the successive stages of ionization of a given atom (such as Fe^{4+}, Fe^{3+}, Fe^{2+}, Fe^{+}, Fe) usually follow the order 1s, 2s, 2p, 3s, 3p, 3d, 4s, ...

This phenomenon is only paradoxical if it is assumed that the energy order of atomic orbitals is fixed and unaffected by the nuclear charge or by the presence of electrons in other orbitals. If that were the case, the 3d-orbital would have the same energy as the 3p-orbital, as it does in hydrogen, yet it clearly does not. There is no special reason why the Fe^{2+} ion should have the same electron configuration as the chromium atom, given that iron has two more protons in its nucleus than chromium, and that the chemistry of the two species is very different. Melrose and Eric Scerri have analyzed the changes of orbital energy with orbital occupations in terms of the two-electron repulsion integrals of the Hartree–Fock method of atomic structure calculation. In chemical environments, configurations can change even more: Th^{3+} as a bare ion has a configuration of [Rn] 5f^{1}, yet in most Th^{III} compounds the thorium atom has a 6d^{1} configuration instead. Mostly, what is present is rather a superposition of various configurations. For instance, copper metal is poorly described by either an [Ar] 3d^{10} 4s^{1} or an [Ar] 3d^{9} 4s^{2} configuration, but is rather well described as a 90% contribution of the first and a 10% contribution of the second. Indeed, visible light is already enough to excite electrons in most transition metals, and they often continuously "flow" through different configurations when that happens (copper and its group are an exception).

Similar ion-like 3d^{x} 4s^{0} configurations occur in transition metal complexes as described by the simple crystal field theory, even if the metal has oxidation state 0. For example, chromium hexacarbonyl can be described as a chromium atom (not ion) surrounded by six carbon monoxide ligands. The electron configuration of the central chromium atom is described as 3d^{6} with the six electrons filling the three lower-energy d orbitals between the ligands. The other two d orbitals are at higher energy due to the crystal field of the ligands. This picture is consistent with the experimental fact that the complex is diamagnetic, meaning that it has no unpaired electrons. However, in a more accurate description using molecular orbital theory, the d-like orbitals occupied by the six electrons are no longer identical with the d orbitals of the free atom.

=== Other exceptions to Madelung's rule ===
There are several more exceptions to Madelung's rule among the heavier elements, and as atomic number increases it becomes more and more difficult to find simple explanations such as the stability of half-filled subshells. It is possible to predict most of the exceptions by Hartree–Fock calculations, which are an approximate method for taking account of the effect of the other electrons on orbital energies. Qualitatively, for example, the 4d elements have the greatest concentration of Madelung anomalies, because the 4d–5s gap is larger than the 3d–4s and 5d–6s gaps.

For the heavier elements, it is also necessary to take account of the effects of special relativity on the energies of the atomic orbitals, as the inner-shell electrons are moving at speeds approaching the speed of light. In general, these relativistic effects tend to decrease the energy of the s-orbitals in relation to the other atomic orbitals. This is the reason why the 6d elements are predicted to have no Madelung anomalies apart from lawrencium (for which relativistic effects stabilise the p_{1/2} orbital as well and cause its occupancy in the ground state), as relativity intervenes to make the 7s orbitals lower in energy than the 6d ones.

The table below shows the configurations of the f-block (green) and d-block (blue) atoms. It shows the ground state configuration in terms of orbital occupancy, but it does not show the ground state in terms of the sequence of orbital energies as determined spectroscopically. For example, in the transition metals, the 4s orbital is of a higher energy than the 3d orbitals; and in the lanthanides, the 6s is higher than the 4f and 5d. The ground states can be seen in the Electron configurations of the elements (data page). However this also depends on the charge: a calcium atom has 4s lower in energy than 3d, but a Ca^{2+} cation has 3d lower in energy than 4s. In practice the configurations predicted by the Madelung rule are at least close to the ground state even in these anomalous cases. The empty f orbitals in lanthanum, actinium, and thorium contribute to chemical bonding, as do the empty p orbitals in transition metals.

Vacant s, d, and f orbitals have been shown explicitly, as is occasionally done, to emphasise the filling order and to clarify that even orbitals unoccupied in the ground state (e.g. lanthanum 4f or palladium 5s) may be occupied and bonding in chemical compounds. (The same is also true for the p-orbitals, which are not explicitly shown because they are only actually occupied for lawrencium in gas-phase ground states.)

Electron shells filled in violation of Madelung's rule (red) Predictions for elements 109–112
Period 4			Period 5			Period 6			Period 7		
Element	Z	Electron Configuration	Element	Z	Electron Configuration	Element	Z	Electron Configuration	Element	Z	Electron Configuration
						Lanthanum	57	[Xe] 6s^{2} 4f^{0} 5d^{1}	Actinium	89	[Rn] 7s^{2} 5f^{0} 6d^{1}
						Cerium	58	[Xe] 6s^{2} 4f^{1} 5d^{1}	Thorium	90	[Rn] 7s^{2} 5f^{0} 6d^{2}
						Praseodymium	59	[Xe] 6s^{2} 4f^{3} 5d^{0}	Protactinium	91	[Rn] 7s^{2} 5f^{2} 6d^{1}
						Neodymium	60	[Xe] 6s^{2} 4f^{4} 5d^{0}	Uranium	92	[Rn] 7s^{2} 5f^{3} 6d^{1}
						Promethium	61	[Xe] 6s^{2} 4f^{5} 5d^{0}	Neptunium	93	[Rn] 7s^{2} 5f^{4} 6d^{1}
						Samarium	62	[Xe] 6s^{2} 4f^{6} 5d^{0}	Plutonium	94	[Rn] 7s^{2} 5f^{6} 6d^{0}
						Europium	63	[Xe] 6s^{2} 4f^{7} 5d^{0}	Americium	95	[Rn] 7s^{2} 5f^{7} 6d^{0}
						Gadolinium	64	[Xe] 6s^{2} 4f^{7} 5d^{1}	Curium	96	[Rn] 7s^{2} 5f^{7} 6d^{1}
						Terbium	65	[Xe] 6s^{2} 4f^{9} 5d^{0}	Berkelium	97	[Rn] 7s^{2} 5f^{9} 6d^{0}
						Dysprosium	66	[Xe] 6s^{2} 4f^{10} 5d^{0}	Californium	98	[Rn] 7s^{2} 5f^{10} 6d^{0}
						Holmium	67	[Xe] 6s^{2} 4f^{11} 5d^{0}	Einsteinium	99	[Rn] 7s^{2} 5f^{11} 6d^{0}
						Erbium	68	[Xe] 6s^{2} 4f^{12} 5d^{0}	Fermium	100	[Rn] 7s^{2} 5f^{12} 6d^{0}
						Thulium	69	[Xe] 6s^{2} 4f^{13} 5d^{0}	Mendelevium	101	[Rn] 7s^{2} 5f^{13} 6d^{0}
						Ytterbium	70	[Xe] 6s^{2} 4f^{14} 5d^{0}	Nobelium	102	[Rn] 7s^{2} 5f^{14} 6d^{0}
Scandium	21	[Ar] 4s^{2} 3d^{1}	Yttrium	39	[Kr] 5s^{2} 4d^{1}	Lutetium	71	[Xe] 6s^{2} 4f^{14} 5d^{1}	Lawrencium	103	[Rn] 7s^{2} 5f^{14} 6d^{0} 7p^{1}
Titanium	22	[Ar] 4s^{2} 3d^{2}	Zirconium	40	[Kr] 5s^{2} 4d^{2}	Hafnium	72	[Xe] 6s^{2} 4f^{14} 5d^{2}	Rutherfordium	104	[Rn] 7s^{2} 5f^{14} 6d^{2}
Vanadium	23	[Ar] 4s^{2} 3d^{3}	Niobium	41	[Kr] 5s^{1} 4d^{4}	Tantalum	73	[Xe] 6s^{2} 4f^{14} 5d^{3}	Dubnium	105	[Rn] 7s^{2} 5f^{14} 6d^{3}
Chromium	24	[Ar] 4s^{1} 3d^{5}	Molybdenum	42	[Kr] 5s^{1} 4d^{5}	Tungsten	74	[Xe] 6s^{2} 4f^{14} 5d^{4}	Seaborgium	106	[Rn] 7s^{2} 5f^{14} 6d^{4}
Manganese	25	[Ar] 4s^{2} 3d^{5}	Technetium	43	[Kr] 5s^{2} 4d^{5}	Rhenium	75	[Xe] 6s^{2} 4f^{14} 5d^{5}	Bohrium	107	[Rn] 7s^{2} 5f^{14} 6d^{5}
Iron	26	[Ar] 4s^{2} 3d^{6}	Ruthenium	44	[Kr] 5s^{1} 4d^{7}	Osmium	76	[Xe] 6s^{2} 4f^{14} 5d^{6}	Hassium	108	[Rn] 7s^{2} 5f^{14} 6d^{6}
Cobalt	27	[Ar] 4s^{2} 3d^{7}	Rhodium	45	[Kr] 5s^{1} 4d^{8}	Iridium	77	[Xe] 6s^{2} 4f^{14} 5d^{7}	Meitnerium	109	[Rn] 7s^{2} 5f^{14} 6d^{7}
Nickel	28	[Ar] 4s^{2} 3d^{8} or [Ar] 4s^{1} 3d^{9} (disputed)	Palladium	46	[Kr] 5s^{0} 4d^{10}	Platinum	78	[Xe] 6s^{1} 4f^{14} 5d^{9}	Darmstadtium	110	[Rn] 7s^{2} 5f^{14} 6d^{8}
Copper	29	[Ar] 4s^{1} 3d^{10}	Silver	47	[Kr] 5s^{1} 4d^{10}	Gold	79	[Xe] 6s^{1} 4f^{14} 5d^{10}	Roentgenium	111	[Rn] 7s^{2} 5f^{14} 6d^{9}
Zinc	30	[Ar] 4s^{2} 3d^{10}	Cadmium	48	[Kr] 5s^{2} 4d^{10}	Mercury	80	[Xe] 6s^{2} 4f^{14} 5d^{10}	Copernicium	112	[Rn] 7s^{2} 5f^{14} 6d^{10}

The various anomalies describe the free atoms and do not necessarily predict chemical behavior. Thus for example neodymium typically forms the +3 oxidation state, despite its configuration [Xe] 4f^{4} 5d^{0} 6s^{2} that if interpreted naïvely would suggest a more stable +2 oxidation state corresponding to losing only the 6s electrons. Contrariwise, uranium as [Rn] 5f^{3} 6d^{1} 7s^{2} is not very stable in the +3 oxidation state either, preferring +4 and +6.

The electron-shell configuration of elements beyond hassium has not yet been empirically verified, but they are expected to follow Madelung's rule without exceptions until element 120. Element 121 should have the anomalous configuration [Og] 8s^{2} 5g^{0} 6f^{0} 7d^{0} 8p^{1}, having a p rather than a g electron. Electron configurations beyond this are tentative and predictions differ between models, but Madelung's rule is expected to break down due to the closeness in energy of the 5g, 6f, 7d, and 8p_{1/2} orbitals. That said, the filling sequence 8s, 5g, 6f, 7d, 8p is predicted to hold approximately, with perturbations due to the huge spin-orbit splitting of the 8p and 9p shells, and the huge relativistic stabilisation of the 9s shell.

== Open and closed shells ==
In the context of atomic orbitals, an open shell is a valence shell which is not completely filled with electrons or that has not given all of its valence electrons through chemical bonds with other atoms or molecules during a chemical reaction. Conversely a closed shell is obtained with a completely filled valence shell. This configuration is very stable.

For molecules, "open shell" signifies that there are unpaired electrons. In molecular orbital theory, this leads to molecular orbitals that are singly occupied. In computational chemistry implementations of molecular orbital theory, open-shell molecules have to be handled by either the restricted open-shell Hartree–Fock method or the unrestricted Hartree–Fock method. Conversely a closed-shell configuration corresponds to a state where all molecular orbitals are either doubly occupied or empty (a singlet state). Open shell molecules are more difficult to study computationally.

== Noble gas configuration ==
Noble gas configuration is the electron configuration of noble gases. The basis of all chemical reactions is the tendency of chemical elements to acquire stability. Main-group atoms generally obey the octet rule, while transition metals generally obey the 18-electron rule. The noble gases (He, Ne, Ar, Kr, Xe, Rn) are less reactive than other elements because they already have a noble gas configuration. Oganesson is predicted to be more reactive due to relativistic effects for heavy atoms.

Period	Element	Configuration						
1	He	1s^{2}						
2	Ne	1s^{2}	2s^{2} 2p^{6}					
3	Ar	1s^{2}	2s^{2} 2p^{6}	3s^{2} 3p^{6}				
4	Kr	1s^{2}	2s^{2} 2p^{6}	3s^{2} 3p^{6}	4s^{2} 3d^{10} 4p^{6}			
5	Xe	1s^{2}	2s^{2} 2p^{6}	3s^{2} 3p^{6}	4s^{2} 3d^{10} 4p^{6}	5s^{2} 4d^{10} 5p^{6}		
6	Rn	1s^{2}	2s^{2} 2p^{6}	3s^{2} 3p^{6}	4s^{2} 3d^{10} 4p^{6}	5s^{2} 4d^{10} 5p^{6}	6s^{2} 4f^{14} 5d^{10} 6p^{6}	
7	Og	1s^{2}	2s^{2} 2p^{6}	3s^{2} 3p^{6}	4s^{2} 3d^{10} 4p^{6}	5s^{2} 4d^{10} 5p^{6}	6s^{2} 4f^{14} 5d^{10} 6p^{6}	7s^{2} 5f^{14} 6d^{10} 7p^{6}

Every system has the tendency to acquire the state of stability or a state of minimum energy, and so chemical elements take part in chemical reactions to acquire a stable electronic configuration similar to that of its nearest noble gas. An example of this tendency is two hydrogen (H) atoms reacting with one oxygen (O) atom to form water (H_{2}O). Neutral atomic hydrogen has one electron in its valence shell, and on formation of water it acquires a share of a second electron coming from oxygen, so that its configuration is similar to that of its nearest noble gas helium (He) with two electrons in its valence shell. Similarly, neutral atomic oxygen has six electrons in its valence shell, and acquires a share of two electrons from the two hydrogen atoms, so that its configuration is similar to that of its nearest noble gas neon with eight electrons in its valence shell.

== Electron configuration in molecules ==
Electron configuration in molecules is more complex than the electron configuration of atoms, as each molecule has a different orbital structure. The molecular orbitals are labelled according to their symmetry, (Note: The labels are written in lowercase to indicate that they correspond to one-electron functions. They are numbered consecutively for each symmetry type (irreducible representation in the character table of the point group for the molecule), starting from the orbital of lowest energy for that type.) rather than the atomic orbital labels used for atoms and monatomic ions; hence, the electron configuration of the dioxygen molecule, O_{2}, is written 1σ_{g}^{2} 1σ_{u}^{2} 2σ_{g}^{2} 2σ_{u}^{2} 3σ_{g}^{2} 1π_{u}^{4} 1π_{g}^{2}, or equivalently 1σ_{g}^{2} 1σ_{u}^{2} 2σ_{g}^{2} 2σ_{u}^{2} 1π_{u}^{4} 3σ_{g}^{2} 1π_{g}^{2}. The term 1π_{g}^{2} represents the two electrons in the two degenerate π*-orbitals (antibonding). From Hund's rules, these electrons have parallel spins in the ground state, and so dioxygen has a net magnetic moment (it is paramagnetic). The explanation of the paramagnetism of dioxygen was a major success for molecular orbital theory.

The electronic configuration of polyatomic molecules can change without absorption or emission of a photon through vibronic couplings.

=== Electron configuration in solids ===
In a solid, the electron states become very numerous. They cease to be discrete, and effectively blend into continuous ranges of possible states (an electron band). The notion of electron configuration ceases to be relevant, and yields to band theory.

== Applications ==
The most widespread application of electron configurations is in the rationalization of chemical properties, in both inorganic and organic chemistry. In effect, electron configurations, along with some simplified forms of molecular orbital theory, have become the modern equivalent of the valence concept, describing the number and type of chemical bonds that an atom can be expected to form.

This approach is taken further in computational chemistry, which typically attempts to make quantitative estimates of chemical properties. For many years, most such calculations relied upon the "linear combination of atomic orbitals" (LCAO) approximation, using an ever-larger and more complex basis set of atomic orbitals as the starting point. The last step in such a calculation is the assignment of electrons among the molecular orbitals according to the aufbau principle. Not all methods in computational chemistry rely on electron configuration: density functional theory (DFT) is an important example of a method that discards the model.

For atoms or molecules with more than one electron, the motion of electrons are correlated and such a picture is no longer exact. A very large number of electronic configurations are needed to exactly describe any multi-electron system, and precisely associating a certain energy level with any single configuration is not possible. However, the electronic wave function is usually dominated by a very small number of configurations and therefore the notion of electronic configuration remains essential for multi-electron systems.

A fundamental application of electron configurations is in the interpretation of atomic spectra. In this case, it is necessary to supplement the electron configuration with one or more term symbols, which describe the different energy levels available to an atom. Term symbols can be calculated for any electron configuration, not just the ground-state configuration listed in tables, although not all the energy levels are observed in practice. It is through the analysis of atomic spectra that the ground-state electron configurations of the elements were experimentally determined.

== See also ==
- Born–Oppenheimer approximation
- d electron count
- Electron configurations of the elements (data page)
- Extended periodic table – discusses the limits of the periodic table
- Group (periodic table)
- HOMO/LUMO
- Molecular term symbol
- Octet rule
- Periodic table (electron configurations)
- Spherical harmonics
- Unpaired electron
- Valence shell
