= Sharp series =

Series of lines in atomic spectra

The sharp series is a series of spectral lines in the atomic emission spectrum caused when electrons descend from higher-energy s orbitals of an atom to the lowest available p orbital. The spectral lines include some in the visible light, and they extend into the ultraviolet. The lines get closer and closer together as the frequency increases never exceeding the series limit. The sharp series was important in the development of the understanding of electron shells and subshells in atoms. The sharp series has given the letter s to the s atomic orbital or subshell.

The sharp series has a limit given by

$v=\frac{R}{\left[ 2+p\right]^2}-\frac{R}{\left[ m+s\right]^2} \text{ with } m=2,3,4,5,6,...$

The series is caused by transitions to the lowest P state from higher energy S orbitals. One terminology to identify the lines is: 1P-mS But note that 1P just means the lowest P state in an atom and that the modern designation would start at 2P, and is larger for higher atomic numbered atoms.

The terms can have different designations, mS for single line systems, mσ for doublets and ms for triplets.

Since the P state is not the lowest energy level for the alkali atom (the S is) the sharp series will not show up as absorption in a cool gas, however it shows up as emission lines. The Rydberg correction is largest for the S term as the electron penetrates the inner core of electrons more.

The limit for the series corresponds to electron emission, where the electron has so much energy it escapes the atom. Even though the series is called sharp, the lines may not be sharp.

In alkali metals the P terms are split $2P_{\frac{3}{2}}$ and $2P_{\frac{1}{2}}$. This causes the spectral lines to be doublets, with a constant spacing between the two parts of the double line.

== Names ==
The sharp series used to be called the second subordinate series, with the diffuse series being the first subordinate, both being subordinate to the principal series.

== Laws for alkali metals ==
The sharp series limit is the same as the diffuse series limit. In the late 1800s these two were termed supplementary series.

In 1896 Arthur Schuster stated his law: "If we subtract the frequency of the fundamental vibration from the convergence frequency of the principal series, we obtain the convergence frequency of the supplementary series". But in the next issue of the journal he realised that Rydberg had published the idea a few months earlier.

Rydberg Schuster Law: Using wave numbers, the difference between the sharp and diffuse series limits and principle series limit is the same as the first transition in the principal series.

- This difference is the lowest P level.

Runge's Law: Using wave numbers the difference between the sharp series limit and fundamental series limit is the same as the first transition in the diffuse series.

- This difference is the lowest D level energy.

== Sodium ==
Grotrian diagram for sodium. Sharp series is due to 3p-mS transitions shown here in purple.

The sharp series has wave numbers given by: $\nu_s = R \left(\frac{Z_{3p}^2}{3^2} - \frac{Z_{ns}^2}{n^2}\right) n=4,5,6,...$

The sodium diffuse series has wave numbers given by: $\nu_d = R \left(\frac{Z_{3p}^2}{3^2} - \frac{Z_{nd}^2}{n^2}\right) n=4,5,6,...$

when n tends to infinity the diffuse and sharp series end up with the same limit.

sodium sharp series
transition	wavelength 1 Å	wavelength 2 Å
3P-4S	11403.8	11381.5
3P-5S	6160.75	6154.23
3P-6S	5158.84	5153.40
3P-7S	4751.82	4747.94
3P-8S	4545.19	4541.63
3P-9S	4423.35	4419.89
3P-10S	4344.74	4341.49
3P-11S	4291.01	4287.84
3P-12S	4252.52	4249.41
3P-13S	4223.2	4220.2
3P-14S	4201.0	4198.0

== Potassium ==
potassium sharp series
transition	wavelength 1 Å	wavelength 2 Å
4P-5S	12522.1	12432.2
4P-6S	6933.8	6911.1
4P-7S	5801.8	5782.4
4P-8S	5339.8	5323.4
4P-9S	5099.2	5084.3
4P-10S	4956.1	4942.0
4P-11S	4863.6	4850.0
4P-12S	4800.2	4786.9
4P-13S	4754.6	4741.6

== Alkaline earths ==
A sharp series of triplet lines is designated by series letter s and formula 1p-ms. The sharp series of singlet lines has series letter S and formula 1P-mS.

== Calcium ==
Calcium has a sharp series of triplets and a sharp series of singlets.

== Magnesium ==
Magnesium has a sharp series of triplets and a sharp series of singlets.

== History ==
At Cambridge University George Liveing and James Dewar set out to systematically measure spectra of elements from groups I, II and III in visible light and ultraviolet that would transmit through air. They noticed that lines for sodium were alternating sharp and diffuse. They were the first to use the term "sharp" for the lines. They classified alkali metal spectral lines into sharp and diffuse categories. In 1890 the lines that also appeared in the absorption spectrum were termed the principal series. Rydberg continued the use of sharp and diffuse for the other lines, whereas Kayser and Runge preferred to use the term second subordinate series for the sharp series.

Arno Bergmann found a fourth series in infrared in 1907, and this became known as Bergmann Series or fundamental series.

In 1896 Edward C. Pickering found a new series of lines in the spectrum of ζ Puppis. This was believed to be the sharp series of hydrogen. In 1915 proof was given that it was actually ionised helium - helium II.

Heinrich Kayser, Carl Runge and Johannes Rydberg found mathematical relations between the wave numbers of emission lines of the alkali metals.

Friedrich Hund introduced the s, p, d, f notation for subshells in atoms. Others followed this use in the 1930s and the terminology has remained to this day.
