= Principal series =

Principal series may refer to:

- Principal series (spectroscopy), series of spectral lines
- Principal series representation, topological group theory,
