= Diffuse series =

Series of lines in atomic spectra

The diffuse series is a series of spectral lines in the atomic emission spectrum caused when electrons jump between the lowest p orbital and d orbitals of an atom. The total orbital angular momentum changes between 1 and 2. The spectral lines include some in the visible light, and may extend into ultraviolet or near infrared. The lines get closer and closer together as the frequency increases never exceeding the series limit. The diffuse series was important in the development of the understanding of electron shells and subshells in atoms. The diffuse series has given the letter d to the d atomic orbital or subshell.

The diffuse series has values given by

$v=\frac{R}{\left[ 2+p\right]^2}-\frac{R}{\left[ m+d\right]^2} \quad\text{where} \;\, m=2,3,4,...$

Grotrian diagram for sodium. The diffuse series is due to the 3p-nd transitions shown here in blue.

The series is caused by transitions from the lowest P state to higher energy D orbitals. One terminology to identify the lines is: 1P-mD But note that 1P just means the lowest P state in the valence shell of an atom and that the modern designation would start at 2P, and is larger for higher atomic numbered atoms.

The terms can have different designations, mD for single line systems, mδ for doublets and md for triplets.

Since the Electron in the D subshell state is not the lowest energy level for the alkali atom (the S is) the diffuse series will not show up as absorption in a cool gas, however it shows up as emission lines. The Rydberg correction is largest for the S term as the electron penetrates the inner core of electrons more.

The limit for the series corresponds to electron emission, where the electron has so much energy it escapes the atom.

In alkali metals the P terms are split $2P_{\frac{3}{2}}$ and $2P_{\frac{1}{2}}$. This causes the spectral lines to be doublets, with a constant spacing between the two parts of the double line.

This splitting is called fine structure. The splitting is larger for atoms with higher atomic number. The splitting decreases towards the series limit. Another splitting occurs on the redder line of the doublet. This is because of splitting in the D level $nd^2D_{\frac{3}{2}}$ and $nd^2D_{\frac{5}{2}}$. Splitting in the D level has a lesser amount than the P level, and it reduces as the series limit is approached.

== History ==
The diffuse series used to be called the first subordinate series, with the sharp series being the second subordinate, both being subordinate to (less intense than) the principal series.

== Laws for alkali metals ==
The diffuse series limit is the same as the sharp series limit. In the late 1800s these two were termed supplementary series.

Spectral lines of the diffuse series are split into three lines in what is called fine structure. These lines cause the overall line to look diffuse. The reason this happens is that both the P and D levels are split into two closely spaced energies. P is split into $P_\frac{1}{2}\ and\ P_\frac{3}{2}$ . D is split into $D_\frac{3}{2}\ and\ D_\frac{5}{2}$. Only three of the possible four transitions can take place because the angular momentum change cannot have a magnitude greater than one.

In 1896 Arthur Schuster stated his law: "If we subtract the frequency of the fundamental vibration from the convergence frequency of the principal series, we obtain the convergence frequency of the supplementary series". But in the next issue of the journal he realised that Rydberg had published the idea a few months earlier.

Rydberg Schuster Law: Using wave numbers, the difference between the diffuse and sharp series limits and principal series limit is the same as the first transition in the principal series.

This difference is the lowest P level.

Runge's Law: Using wave numbers the difference between the diffuse series limit and fundamental series limit is the same as the first transition in the diffuse series.

This difference is the lowest D level energy.

=== Lithium ===
Lithium has a diffuse series with diffuse lines averaged around 6103.53, 4603.0, 4132.3, 3915.0 and 3794.7 Å.

=== Sodium ===
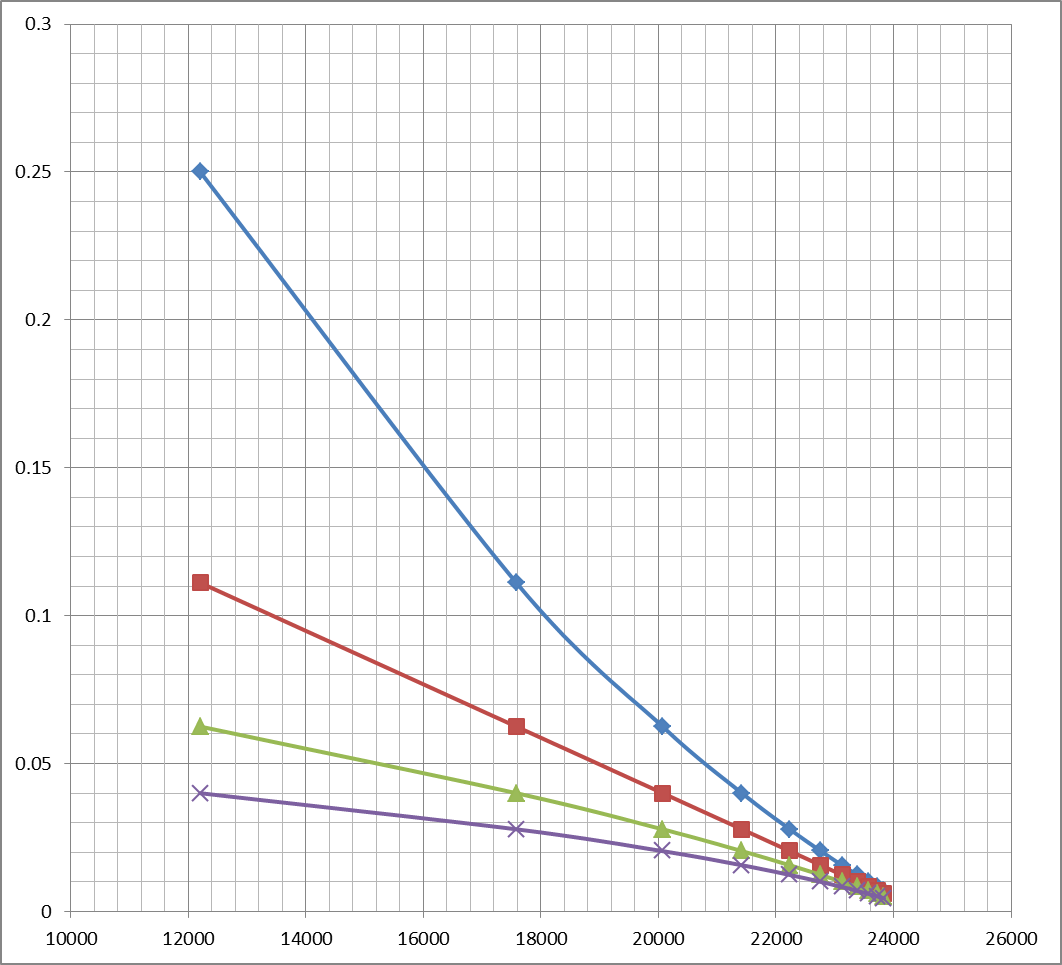
Graph showing wavelengths of the diffuse series of sodium plotted against N^{−2} (inverse square) making assumptions of different starting point of n. Blue diamond starts with n=2, red square starts with n=3, green triangle starts with n=4, violet X starts with n=5. Only with starting n of 3 is a straight line achieved

The sodium diffuse series has wave numbers given by: $\nu_d = R \left(\frac{Z_{3p}^2}{3^2} - \frac{Z_{nd}^2}{n^2}\right) \quad\text{where} \;\, n=3,4,5,6,...$

The sharp series has wave numbers given by: $\nu_s = R \left(\frac{Z_{3p}^2}{3^2} - \frac{Z_{ns}^2}{n^2}\right) \quad\text{where} \;\, n=4,5,6,...$

when n tends to infinity the diffuse and sharp series end up with the same limit.

sodium diffuse series
transition	wavelength 1 Å	wavelength 2 Å	wavelength 3 Å
3P-3D	8194.82	8183.26	8194.79
3P-4D	5688.21	5682.63	5688.19
3P-5D	4982.81	4978.54	4982.8
3P-6D	4668.56	4664.81	4668.6
3P-7D	4497.66	4494.18	4497.7
3P-8D	4393.34	4390.03	4393.3
3P-9D	4324.62	4321.40	4324.6
3P-10D	4276.79	4273.64	4276.8
3P-11D	4242.08	4238.99	4242.0
3P-12D	4215		
3P-13D	4195		

=== Potassium ===
potassium diffuse series
transition	wavelength 1 Å	wavelength 2 Å	wavelength 3 Å
4P-3D	11772.8	11690.2	11769.7
4P-4D	6964.69	6936.27	6964.18
4P-5D	5831.9	5812.2	5831.7
4P-6D	5359.7	5343.1	5359.6
4P-7D	5112.2	5097.2	5112.2
4P-8D	4965.0	4950.8	4965.0
4P-9D	4869.8	4856.1	4869.8
4P-10D	4804.3	4791.0	4804.3
4P-11D	4757.4	4744.4	4757.4

== Alkaline earths ==
A diffuse series of triplet lines is designated by series letter d and formula 1p-md. The diffuse series of singlet lines has series letter S and formula 1P-mS.

=== Helium ===
Helium is in the same category as alkaline earths with respect to spectroscopy, as it has two electrons in the S subshell as do the other alkaline earths. Helium has a diffuse series of doublet lines with wavelengths 5876, 4472 and 4026 Å. Helium when ionised is termed He^{II} and has a spectrum very similar to hydrogen but shifted to shorter wavelengths. This has a diffuse series as well with wavelengths at 6678, 4922 and 4388 Å.

=== Magnesium ===
Magnesium has a diffuse series of triplets and a sharp series of singlets.

=== Calcium ===
Calcium has a diffuse series of triplets and a sharp series of singlets.

=== Strontium ===
With strontium vapour, the most prominent lines are from the diffuse series.

=== Barium ===
Barium has a diffuse series running from infrared to ultraviolet with wavelengths at 25515.7, 23255.3, 22313.4; 5818.91, 5800.30, 5777.70; 4493.66, 4489.00; 4087.31, 4084.87; 3898.58, 3894.34; 3789.72, 3788.18; 3721.17, and 3720.85 Å

== History ==
At Cambridge University George Liveing and James Dewar set out to systematically measure spectra of elements from groups I, II and III in visible light and longer wave ultraviolet that would transmit through air. They noticed that lines for sodium were alternating sharp and diffuse. They were the first to use the term "diffuse" for the lines. They classified alkali metal spectral lines into sharp and diffuse categories. In 1890 the lines that also appeared in the absorption spectrum were termed the principal series. Rydberg continued the use of sharp and diffuse for the other lines, whereas Kayser and Runge preferred to use the term first subordinate series for the diffuse series.

Arno Bergmann found a fourth series in infrared in 1907, and this became known as Bergmann Series or fundamental series.

Heinrich Kayser, Carl Runge and Johannes Rydberg found mathematical relations between the wave numbers of emission lines of the alkali metals.

Friedrich Hund introduced the s, p, d, f notation for subshells in atoms. Others followed this use in the 1930s and the terminology has remained to this day.
