= Kilokaiser =

Unit for energy transition between electronic states

The Kaiser (K) is a unit of energy. A common form is kiloKaiser (kK), for which 1 kK = 1000 cm^{−1}, where cm^{−1} is the unit of wavenumber or inverse wavelength. This unit is most commonly used with respect to energy transitions between electronic states in inorganic complexes.

Kilokaiser is a common but incorrect spelling of the unit kiloKayser. The unit is named after Heinrich Gustav Johannes Kayser (16 March 1853 – 14 October 1940), a German physicist.

== See also ==
- Wavenumber
