= James Dewar =

British chemist and physicist (1842–1923)

Sir James Dewar FRS FRSE
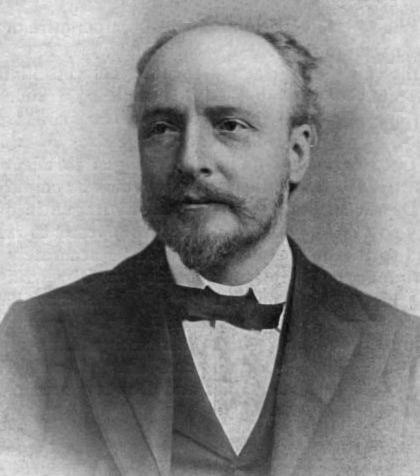
- Born: 20 September 1842; Kincardine-on-Forth, Scotland
- Died: 27 March 1923 (aged 80); London, England
- Education: University of Edinburgh
- Known for: Cordite; Diffuse and Sharp series; Liquid oxygen; Solid oxygen; Liquid hydrogen; Solid hydrogen; Dewar flask; Dewar benzene
- Awards: Hodgkins gold medal (1899); Bakerian Medal (1901); Lavoisier Medal (1904); Rumford Medal (1894); Matteucci Medal (1906); Albert Medal (1908); Davy Medal (1909); Copley Medal (1916); Franklin Medal (1919)
- Scientific career
- Fields: Physics, chemistry
- Workplaces: Royal Institution; Peterhouse, Cambridge
- Doctoral advisor: Lord Playfair

Sir James Dewar (/djuːər/ DEW-ər; 20 September 1842 – 27 March 1923) was a Scottish chemist and physicist. He is best known for his invention of the vacuum flask, which he used in conjunction for his research into the liquefaction of gases. He also studied atomic and molecular spectroscopy, working in these fields for more than twenty-five years. Dewar was nominated for the Nobel Prize eight times — five times in Physics and three times in Chemistry — but he was never so honoured.

== Early life ==
James Dewar was born in Kincardine, Perthshire (now in Fife) in 1842, the youngest of six boys of Ann Dewar and Thomas Dewar, a vintner. He was educated at Kincardine Parish School and then Dollar Academy. His parents died when he was fifteen. He attended the University of Edinburgh where he studied chemistry under Lyon Playfair (later Baron Playfair), becoming Playfair's personal assistant. Later, Dewar also studied under August Kekulé at Ghent University.

== Career ==
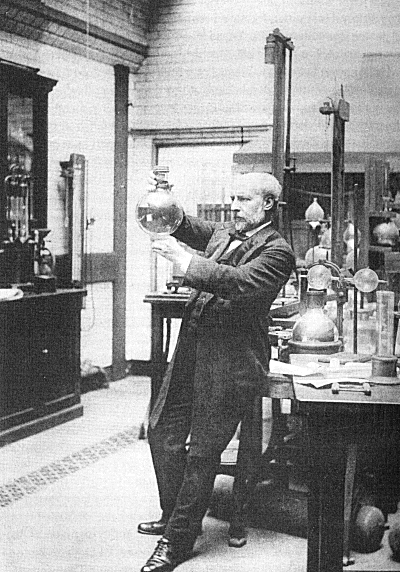
James Dewar in the Royal Institution in London, around 1900

In 1875, Dewar was elected Jacksonian professor of natural experimental philosophy at the University of Cambridge, becoming a member of Peterhouse. He became a member of the Royal Institution and later, in 1877, replaced Dr. John Hall Gladstone as Fullerian Professor of Chemistry. Dewar was also the president of the Society of Chemical Industry from 1887-88, President of the Chemical Society in 1897 and the British Association for the Advancement of Science in 1902, as well as serving on the Royal Commission established to examine London's water supply from 1893 to 1894 and the Committee on Explosives. While serving on the Committee on Explosives, he and Frederick Augustus Abel developed cordite, a smokeless gunpowder alternative.

In 1867, Dewar described several chemical formulas for benzene, which were published in 1869. One of the formulae, which does not represent benzene correctly and was not advocated by Dewar, is sometimes still referred to as Dewar benzene. In 1869, he was elected a Fellow of the Royal Society of Edinburgh, after being nominated by his former mentor, Lyon Playfair.

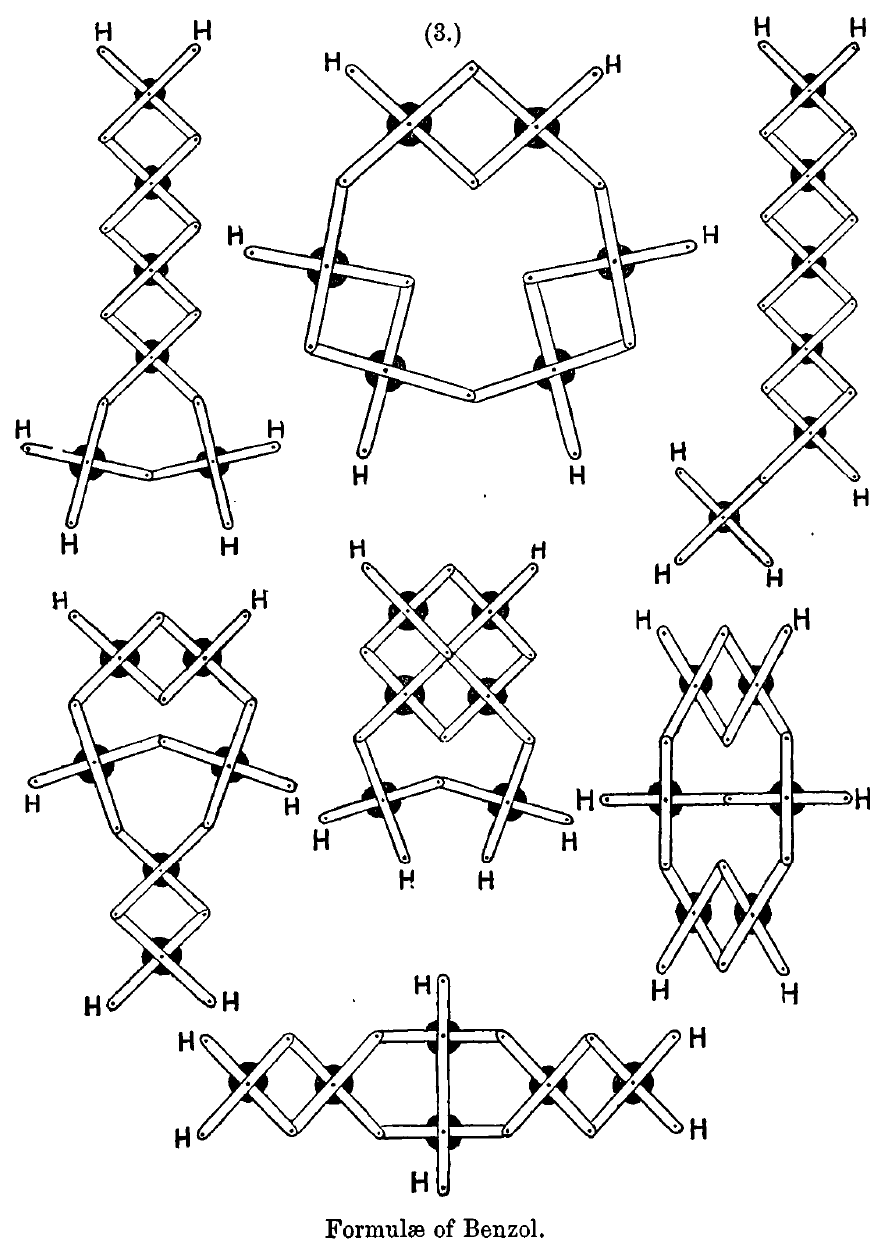
Seven possible isomers of benzene, as proposed by Dewar

His scientific work covers a wide field – his earlier papers cover topics including organic chemistry, hydrogen and its physical constants, high-temperature research, the temperature of the Sun and the electric spark, spectrophotometry, and the chemistry of the electric arc.

With Professor J. G. McKendrick, of the University of Glasgow, he investigated the physiological action of light and examined the changes that take place in the electrical condition of the retina under its influence. With Professor G. D. Liveing, one of his colleagues at the University of Cambridge, he began in 1878 a long series of spectroscopic observations, the latter of which were devoted to the spectroscopic examination of various gaseous elements separated from atmospheric air under extremely cold conditions. He also joined Professor J. A. Fleming, of University College London, in the investigation of the electrical behaviour of substances cooled to very low temperatures.

His name is most widely known in connection with his work on the liquefaction of the so-called permanent gases and his research at temperatures approaching absolute zero. His interest in this branch of physics and chemistry dates back at least as far as 1874, when he discussed the "Latent Heat of Liquid Gases" before the British Association. In 1878, he devoted a Friday evening lecture at the Royal Institution to the then-recent work of Louis Paul Cailletet and Raoul Pictet, and exhibited for the first time in Great Britain the working of the Cailletet apparatus. Six years later, again at the Royal Institution, he described the research of Zygmunt Florenty Wróblewski and Karol Olszewski, and illustrated for the first time in public the liquefaction of oxygen and air. Soon afterward, he built a machine from which the liquefied gas could be drawn off through a valve for use as a cooling agent, before using the liquid oxygen in research work related to meteorites; about the same time, he also obtained oxygen in the solid state.

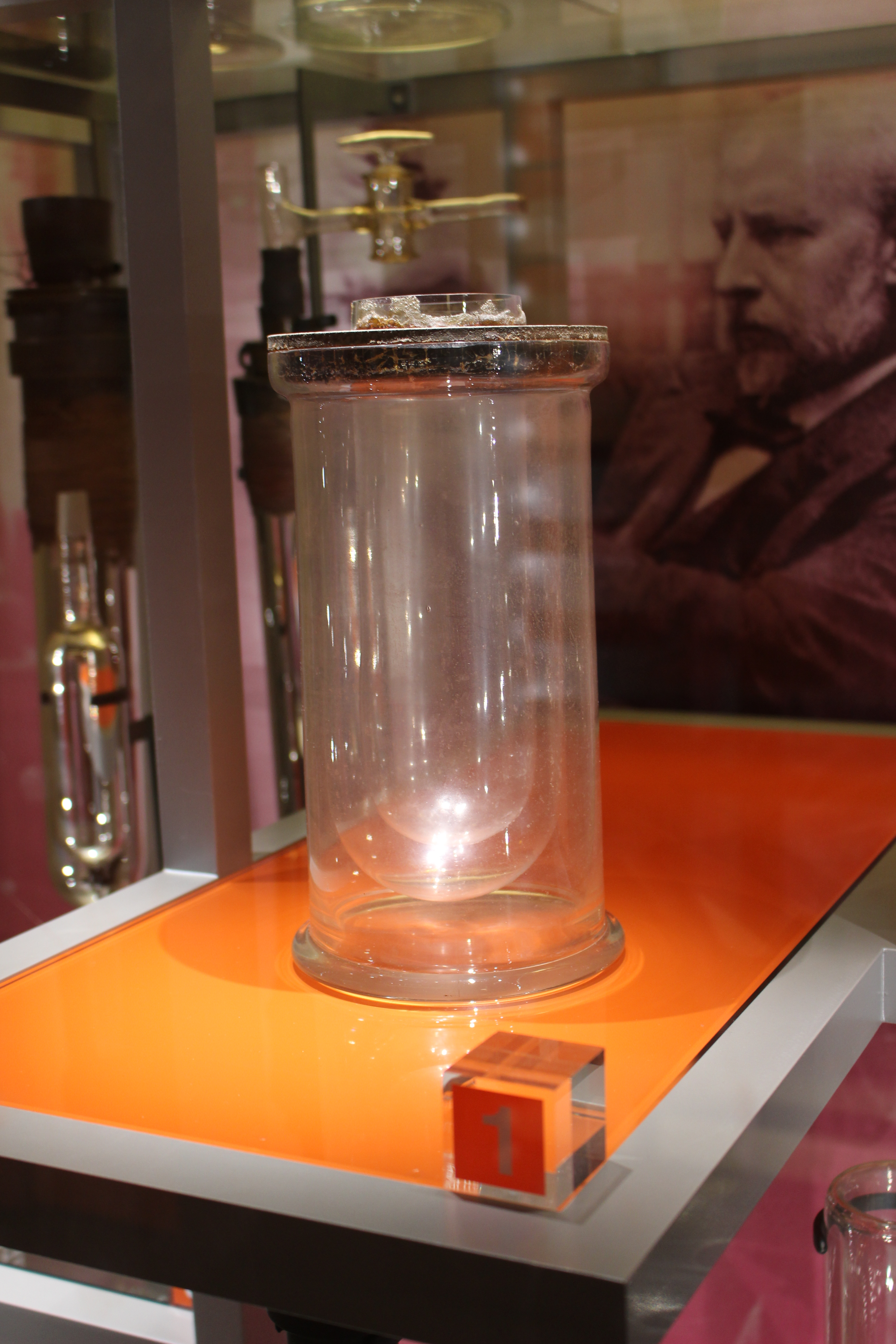
Dewar's vacuum flask in the museum of the Royal Institution

By 1891, he had designed and built, at the Royal Institution, machinery which yielded liquid oxygen in industrial quantities, and towards the end of that year, he showed that magnets strongly attract both liquid oxygen and liquid ozone. Around 1892, the idea occurred to him of using vacuum-jacketed vessels for the storage of liquid gases – the Dewar flask (otherwise known as a Thermos or vacuum flask) – the invention for which he became most famous. The vacuum flask was so efficient at keeping heat out, it was found possible to preserve liquids for comparatively long periods without the need for refrigeration, making examination of their optical properties possible. Dewar did not profit from the widespread adoption of his vacuum flask – he lost a court case against Thermos concerning the patent for his invention. Although he was recognised as its inventor, there was no way for him to prevent Thermos from using his design since he did not patent his invention.

His next project was to experiment with a high-pressure hydrogen jet by which low temperatures were realised through the Joule–Thomson effect, and the successful results he obtained led him to build a large regenerative cooling refrigerating machine at the Royal Institution. Using this machine in 1898, liquid hydrogen was collected for the first time, solid hydrogen following in 1899. He tried to liquefy the last remaining gas, helium, which condenses into a liquid at −268.9 °C, but owing to a number of factors, including a short supply of helium, Dewar was preceded by Heike Kamerlingh Onnes as the first person to produce liquid helium, in 1908. Onnes would later be awarded the Nobel Prize in Physics for his research into the properties of matter at low temperatures – Dewar was nominated several times, but never succeeded in winning the Nobel Prize.

In 1905, he and J. A. Fleming began to investigate the gas-absorbing powers of charcoal when cooled to low temperatures and applied his research into the creation of a high vacuum, which was used for further experiments in atomic physics. Dewar continued his research work into the properties of elements at low temperatures, specifically low-temperature calorimetry, until the outbreak of World War I. The Royal Institution laboratories lost a number of staff to the war effort, both in fighting and scientific roles, and after the war, Dewar had little interest in restarting the serious research work that had gone on before the war. Shortages of scholars necessarily compounded the problems. His research during and after the war mainly involved investigating surface tension in soap bubbles and the detection of infrared radiation in the atmosphere, rather than further work into the properties of matter at low temperatures.

== Later life ==
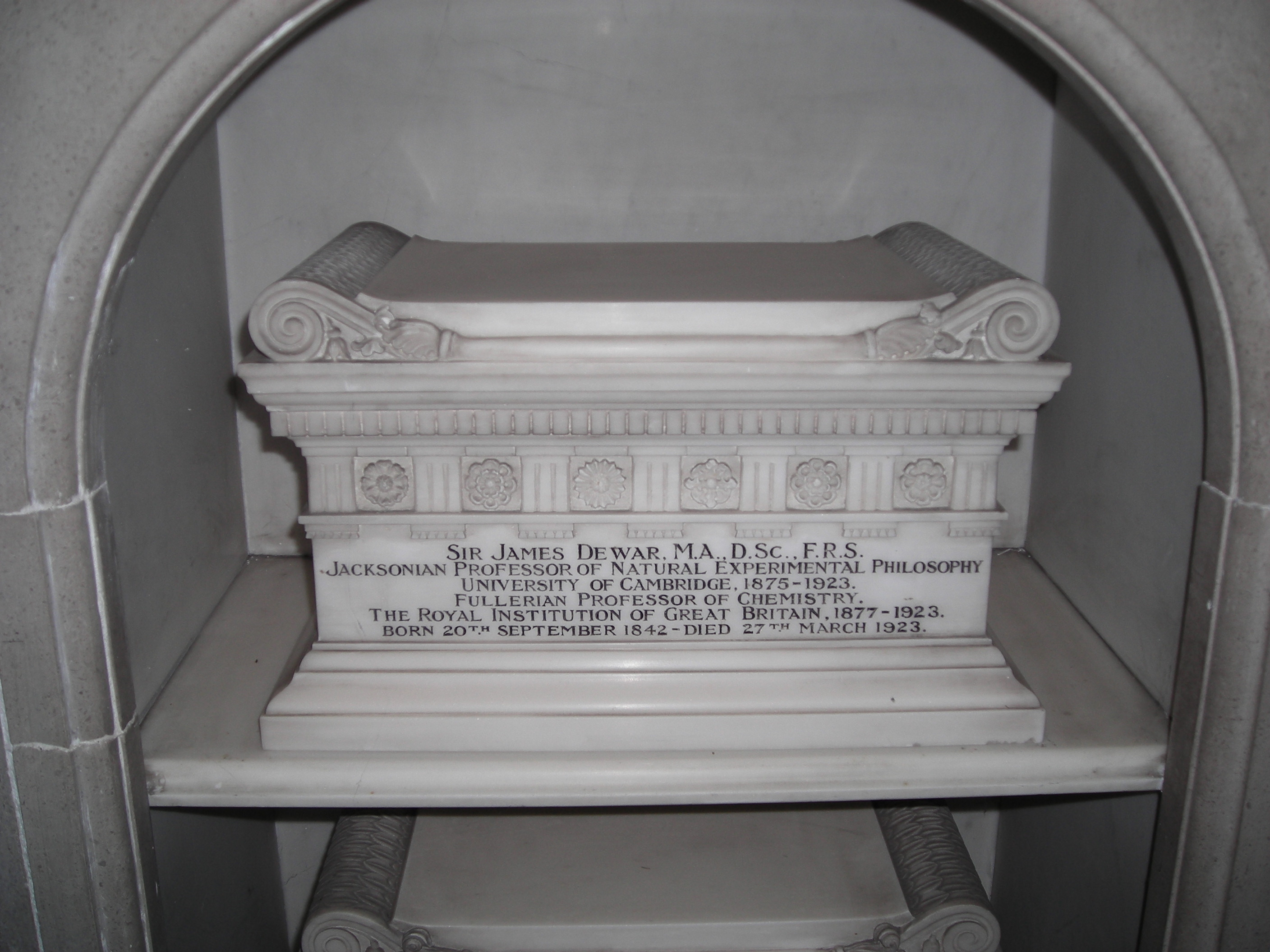
Sir James Dewar's ashes at Golders Green Crematorium

Dewar died at the Royal Institution on 27 March 1923, aged eighty, and was cremated at Golders Green Crematorium in London. An urn with his ashes still resides there.

== Family ==
He married Helen Rose Banks in 1871. They had no children. Helen was a sister-in-law to both Charles Dickson, Lord Dickson and James Douglas Hamilton Dickson.

Dewar's nephew, Dr. Thomas William Dewar FRSE, was an amateur artist who painted a portrait of Sir James Dewar. He is presumably also the same Thomas William Dewar who was mentioned as the executor in James Dewar's will, ultimately replaced "unopposed" by Dewar's wife.

== Royal Institution Christmas Lectures ==
Dewar was invited to deliver several Royal Institution Christmas Lectures:

A Soap Bubble (1878)
Atoms (1880)
Alchemy in Relation to Modern Science (1883)
The Story of a Meteorite (1885)
The Chemistry of Light and Photography (1886)
Clouds and Cloudland (1888)
Frost and Fire (1890)
Air: Gaseous and Liquid (1893)
Christmas Lecture Epilogues (1912)

== Honours and awards ==
Although Dewar was never recognised by the Swedish Academy, he was recognised by many other institutions both before and after his death, in Britain and overseas. The Royal Society elected him a Fellow of the Royal Society in June 1877 and bestowed their Rumford (1894), Davy (1909), and Copley Medal (1916) medals upon him for his work, as well as inviting him to deliver their Bakerian Lecture in 1901. In 1899, he became the first recipient of the Hodgkins gold medal of the Smithsonian Institution, Washington, DC, for his contributions to knowledge of the nature and properties of atmospheric air. That same year, he was elected to the American Philosophical Society, and was elected to the United States National Academy of Sciences in 1907.

He was President of the Society of Chemical Industry from 1887-88.

In 1904, he became the first British subject to receive the Lavoisier Medal of the French Academy of Sciences, and in 1906, he was the first to be awarded the Matteucci Medal of the Italian Society of Sciences. He was knighted in 1904 and awarded the Gunning Victoria Jubilee Prize for 1900–1904 by the Royal Society of Edinburgh, and in 1908, he was awarded the Albert Medal of The Society of Arts. A lunar crater was named in his honour.

A street within the Kings Buildings complex of the University of Edinburgh was named in memory of Dewar in the early 21st century.

== Character ==
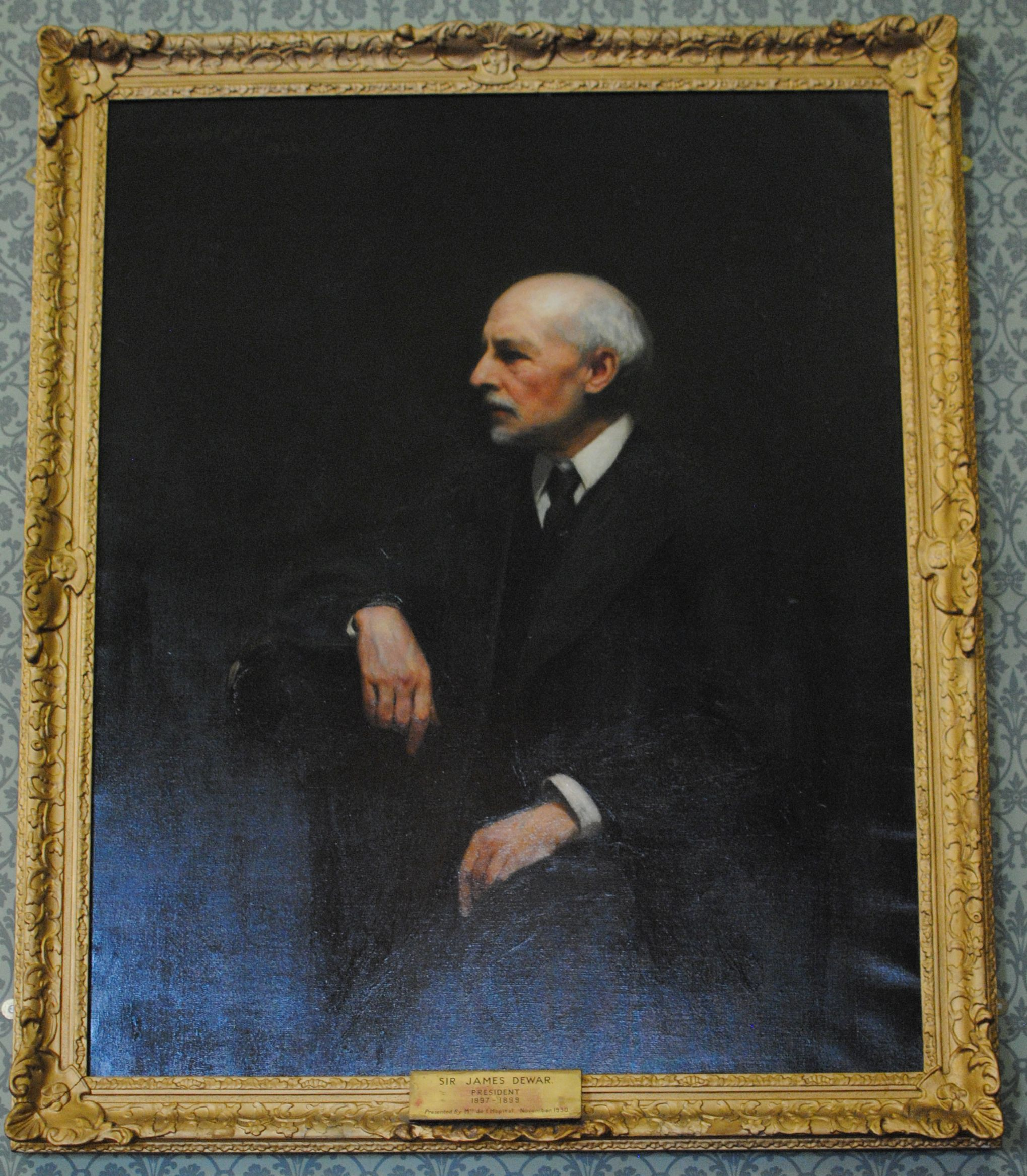
Portrait of Dewar by René le Brun, Comte de L'Hôpital, in the collection of the Royal Society of Chemistry

Dewar's bad temper was legendary. Rowlinson (2012) called him "ruthless", particularly with his colleague Siegfried Ruhemann.

== Selected publications ==
- George Downing Liveing; James Dewar (1915). Collected Papers on Spectroscopy. University press. "Collected Papers on Spectroscopy.", G. D. Living and J. Dewar, Cambridge University Press, 1915
- Pippard, Brian. 1993. "Siegfried Ruhemann (1859-1943), F.R.S. 1914-1923." Notes and Records of the Royal Society of London 47 (2): 271–76.
- Rowlinson, Sir J. S. 2012. Sir James Dewar, 1842–1923: A Ruthless Chemist. Ashgate Publishing, Ltd.

== See also ==
- Cryogenic storage dewar
- Timeline of hydrogen technologies
- Timeline of low-temperature technology

Academic offices
Preceded by Robert Willis	Jacksonian Professor of Natural Philosophy; 1875–1923	Succeeded by C. T. R. Wilson
