= Fundamental series =

Series of lines in atomic spectra

The fundamental series is a set of spectral lines in a set caused by transition between d and f orbitals in atoms.

Originally the series was discovered in the infrared by Fowler and independently by Arno Bergmann. This resulted in the name Bergmann series used for such a set of lines in a spectrum. However the name was changed as Bergmann also discovered other series of lines. And other discoverers also established other such series. They became known as the fundamental series. Bergmann observed lithium at 5347 cm^{−1}, sodium at 5416 cm^{−1} potassium at 6592 cm^{−1}. Bergmann observed that the lines in the series in the caesium spectrum were double. His discovery was announced in Contributions to the Knowledge of the Infra-Red Emission Spectra of the Alkalies, Jena 1907. Carl Runge called this series the "new series". He predicted that the lines of potassium and rubidium would be in pairs. He expressed the frequencies of the series lines by a formula and predicted a connection of the series limit to the other known series. In 1909 W. M. Hicks produced approximate formulas for the various series and noticed that this series had a simpler formula than the others and thus called it the "fundamental series" and used the letter F.

The formula that more resembled the hydrogen spectrum calculations was because of a smaller quantum defect. There is no physical basis to call this fundamental. The fundamental series was described as badly-named. It is the last spectroscopic series to have a special designation. The next series involving transitions between F and G subshells is known as the FG series.

Frequencies of the lines in the series are given by this formula:

$\nu = \frac{R}{\left[ 3+d\right]^2}-\frac{R}{\left[ m+f\right]^2} \text{, with } m=4,5,6,...,$

R is the Rydberg constant, $T_{BS}=\frac{R}{\left[ 3+d\right]^2}$ is the series limit, represented by 3D, and $\frac{R}{\left[ m+f\right]^2}$ is represented by mF. A shortened formula is then given by $\nu=3D-mF$ with values of m being integers from 4 upwards. The two numbers separated by the "−" are called terms, that represent the energy level of an atom.

The limit of the fundamental series is the same as the 3D level.

The terms can have different designations, mF for single line systems, mΦ for doublets and mf for triplets.

Lines in the fundamental series are split into compound doublets, due to the D and F subshells having different spin possibilities. The splitting of the D subshell is very small and that of the F subshell even less so, so the fine structure in the fundamental series is harder to resolve than that in the sharp or diffuse series.

== Lithium ==
The quantum defect for lithium is 0.

== Sodium ==
Grotrian diagram for sodium. Fundamental series is due to 3D-mF transitions shown here in cyan (green).

The fundamental series lines for sodium appear in the near infrared.

sodium fundamental series
transition	wavelength 1 Å
3d-4f	18465.3
3d-5f	12679.2
3d-6f	10834.9
3d-7f	9961.28
3d-8f	9465.94
3d-9f	9153.88
3d-10f	8942.96
3d-11f	8796

== Potassium ==
The fundamental series lines for potassium appear in the near infrared.

potassium fundamental series
transition	wavelength 1 Å	wavelength 2 Å
3d-4f	15163.1	15168.4
3d-5f	11022.3	
3d-6f	9565.6	9597.76
3d-7f	8902.2	8902.4
3d-8f	8503.5	8505.3
3d-9f	8250.2	8251.7

== Rubidium ==
The fundamental series lines for rubidium appear in the near infrared. The valence electron moves from the 4d level as the 3d is contained in an inner shell. They were observed by R von Lamb. Relevant energy levels are 4p^{6}4d j=5/2 19,355.282 cm^{−1} and j=3/2 19,355.623 cm^{−1}, and the first f levels at 4p^{6}4f j=5/2 26,792.185 cm^{−1} and j=7/2 26,792.169 cm^{−1}.

rubidium fundamental series
transition	vacuum wavelength 1 Å 5/2–7/2	vacuum wavelength 2 Å 3/2-5/2
4d-4f	13,446.486	13,447.076
4d-5f	10,078.039	10,078.473
4d-6f	8870.943	8871.281
4d-7f	8273.684	8273.981
4d-8f	7927.440	

== Caesium ==
caesium fundamental series
transition	wavelengths Å		
transition	5/2–7/2	5/2-5/2	3/2-5/2
5d-4f	10,126.376 7	10,126.188	10,027.103 3
5d-5f	8,079.036 3	8,078.936	8,015.726 3
5d-6f	7,279.956 8	7,279.889	7,228.533 6
5d-7f	6,870.454 4		6,824.651 3
5d-8f	6,628.657 6		6,586.021 6
5d-9f	6,472.619 6		6,431.966 2
5d-10f	6,365.522 6		6,326.203 4
5d-11f	6,288.592 7		6,250.214 9
5d-12f	6,231.349 0		6,193.668 9
5d-13f	6,187.544 2		6,150.38
5d-14f	6,153.238 1		6,116.52
