= Principal series (spectroscopy) =

Series of lines in atomic spectra

In atomic emission spectroscopy, the principal series is a series of spectral lines caused when electrons move between p orbitals of an atom and the lowest available s orbital. These lines are usually found in the visible and ultraviolet portions of the electromagnetic spectrum. The principal series has given the letter p to the p atomic orbital and subshell.

Grotrian diagram for sodium. The principal series is due to the 3s-np transitions shown here in red.

The lines are absorption lines when the electron gains energy from an s subshell to a p subshell. When electrons descend in energy they produce an emission spectrum. The term principal came about because this series of lines is observed both in absorption and emission for alkali metal vapours. Other series of lines appear in the emission spectrum only and not in the absorption spectrum, and were named the sharp series and the diffuse series based on the appearance of the lines.
