= Heinrich Kayser =

German physicist and spectroscopist

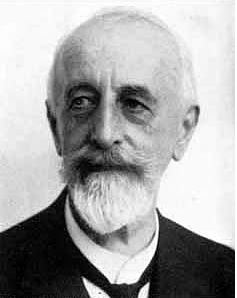
- Born: Heinrich Gustav Johannes Kayser; 16 March 1853; Bingen am Rhein, Grand Duchy of Hesse
- Died: 14 October 1940 (aged 87); Bonn, Germany
- Citizenship: German
- Education: Sophie Gymnasium (Berlin); University of Strasbourg; University of Berlin
- Known for: Helium in the Earth's atmosphere Kayser (unit)
- Awards: ForMemRS (1911)
- Scientific career
- Fields: Physicist, Spectroscopy
- Workplaces: Technische Hochschule, Hannover; University of Bonn
- Doctoral advisor: Wilhelm Röntgen

Heinrich Gustav Johannes Kayser ForMemRS (German: [ˈkaɪzɐ]; 16 March 1853 – 14 October 1940) was a German physicist and spectroscopist.

== Biography ==
Kayser was born at Bingen am Rhein. Kayser's early work was concerned with the characteristics of acoustic waves. He discovered the occurrence of helium in the Earth's atmosphere in 1868 during a solar eclipse when he detected a new spectral line in the solar spectrum. In 1881, Kayser coined the word "adsorption". Together with Carl Runge, he examined the spectra of chemical elements. This included the determination of the wavelengths, brightness and sharpness of 4500 lines from the spectrum of iron, an element chosen to act as the standard, as well as 2000 lines for carbon, since iron was vaporised in a carbon arc. The work was later extended to other elements and they developed empirical formulas for the inverse of the wavelength of the type: $\lambda^{-1}=A+Bm^{-2}+Cm^{-4}$, where $A, B, C$ are constants and $m$ is any positive integer. However, these formulas were superseded by the one by Rydberg. After the conclusion of his collaboration with Runge, he seems to have mostly diverted his research from spectroscopy. In 1905, he wrote a paper on electron theory.

The kayser unit, associated with wavenumber, of the CGS system was named after him, with his early recognition of the importance of the inverse wavelength measurements in vacuum rather than in air cited as a reason. He died at Bonn in 1940.

Kayser at the Fourth Conference International Union for Cooperation in Solar Research at Mount Wilson Observatory, 1910

== Works ==
- Lehrbuch der Physik für Studierende . Enke, Stuttgart 3rd ed. 1900 Digital edition by the University and State Library Düsseldorf
