= Grotrian diagram =

Energy level diagram in atomic physics

A Grotrian diagram of the hydrogen atom. Only transitions between adjacent columns are allowed, as per the selection rule $\Delta \ell=\pm 1$.

A Grotrian diagram, or term diagram, shows the allowed electronic transitions between the energy levels of atoms. They can be used for one-electron and multi-electron atoms. They take into account the specific selection rules related to changes in angular momentum of the electron. The diagrams are named after Walter Grotrian, who introduced them in his 1928 book Graphische Darstellung der Spektren von Atomen und Ionen mit ein, zwei und drei Valenzelektronen ("Graphical representation of the spectra of atoms and ions with one, two and three valence electrons").

== See also ==
- Jablonski diagram (for molecules)
