= Index of chemistry articles =

Chemistry (from Egyptian kēme (chem), meaning "earth") is the physical science concerned with the composition, structure, and properties of matter, as well as the changes it undergoes during chemical reactions.

Below is a list of chemistry-related articles in alphabetical order. Chemical compounds are listed separately at List of inorganic compounds, List of biomolecules, or List of organic compounds.

The Outline of chemistry delineates different aspects of chemistry.

== A ==
- Abichite
- Acetaldehyde
- Acetaminophen
- Acetic acid
- Acetone
- Acetyl
- Acetylcholine
- Acetylene
- Acid
- Acrylamide
- Actinide
- Actinium
- Actinolite
- Activation energy
- Adolf Friedrich Johann Butenandt
- Adolf Otto Reinhold Windaus
- Adolph Wilhelm Hermann Kolbe
- Agate
- Ahmed H. Zewail
- Alabaster
- Alan G MacDiarmid
- Alan J Heeger
- Albertus Magnus
- Albite
- Alchemical symbol
- Alchemist
- Alchemy
- alcohol
- Aldehyde
- Alexandrite
- Alfred Stock
- Alfred Werner
- Alicyclic compound
- Aliphatic compound
- Alkali
- Alkali metal
- Alkaline earth
- Alkane
- Alkene
- Allingite
- Allotrope
- Allotropy
- Alloy
- Alum
- Aluminium
- Aluminium gallium arsenide
- Aluminium oxide
- Alunite
- Alvite
- Amalgam
- Amazonite
- Amber
- Amblygonite
- Amedeo Avogadro
- Americium
- Amethyst
- Amide
- Amine
- Amino acid
- Ammonia
- Ammonium
- Ammonium nitrate
- Ammonium perchlorate
- Amphibole
- Analcim
- Analcite
- Analytical chemistry
- Anatase
- Andalusite
- Andesite
- Anglesite
- Anorthite
- Anorthoclase
- Anorthosite
- Antimony
- Antoine Lavoisier
- Apatite
- Aquamarine
- Aragonite
- Archer John Porter Martin
- Arfvedsonite
- Argon
- Arne Wilhelm Kaurin Tiselius
- Aromatic amine
- Aromatic compound
- Aromatic hydrocarbon
- Arrhenius equation
- Arsenic
- Arthur Harden
- Artturi Ilmari Virtanen
- Asbestos
- Astatine
- Astrochemistry
- Atom
- Atomic absorption spectroscopy
- Atomic mass unit
- Atomic mass
- Atomic nucleus
- Atomic number
- Atomic orbital
- Atomic radius
- Atomic weight
- Auger electron spectroscopy
- Augite
- Axinite
- Azurite

== B ==
- Baddeleyite
- Barite
- Barium
- Barometer
- Basalt
- base
- Bastnasite
- battery
- Bauxite
- Beckerite
- Benzene
- Benzene ring
- Berkelium
- Beryl
- Beryllium
- Bicarbonate
- Bioaccumulate
- Biochemistry
- Bioinformatics
- Biotite
- Bismuth
- Boehmite
- Bohr model
- Bohrium
- Boiling point
- Borane
- Borax
- Boric acid
- Bornite
- Boron
- Boron group
- Boron nitride
- Brass
- Bromine
- Brucite
- Buffer solution
- Bunsen burner
- Burette
- Burmite
- Butane
- N-Butyllithium
- Tert-Butyllithium
- Sec-Butyllithium
- Bytownite

== C ==
- Cadmium
- Calamine
- Calcite
- Calcium
- Calcium carbonate
- Calcium oxide
- Californium
- Calomel
- Calorimeter
- Canfieldite
- Caprazamycin
- Carbohydrate
- Carbon
- Carbon dioxide
- Carbon group
- Carbon monoxide
- Carbonate
- Carbonation
- Carbonic acid
- Carbonyl
- Carboxylic acid
- Carl Bosch
- Carl Remigius Fresenius
- Carl Wilhelm Scheele
- Carnallite
- Carnelian
- Carnotite
- CAS registry number
- Cassiterite
- Catalyst
- Cationic
- Caustic soda
- Celadonite
- Celestine
- Celsius
- Central nervous system
- Cerium
- Cerussite
- Caesium
- Chabasite
- Chalcedony
- Chalcogen
- Chalcopyrite
- Chalcocite
- Chalk
- Charles J. Pedersen
- Chemical bond
- Chemical element
- Chemical elements named after people
- Chemical elements named after places
- Chemical engineering
- Chemical equilibrium
- Chemical formula
- Chemical nomenclature
- Chemical property
- Chemical reaction
- Chemical series
- Chemical thermodynamics
- Cheminformatics
- Chemist
- Chemistry
- Chemistry basic topics
- Chirality
- Chloride
- Chlorin
- Chlorine
- Chlorite
- Chocolate
- Christian B. Anfinsen
- Chromatography
- Chromite
- Chromium
- Chrysoberyl
- Chrysolite
- Cinnabar
- Cinnabarite
- Citric acid
- Citrine quartz
- Clay
- Cleveite
- Clyssus
- Coal
- Cobalt
- Coil (chemistry)
- Coinage metal
- Colemanite
- Colloid
- Color
- Colorimeter
- Coltan
- Columbite
- Combinatorial chemistry
- Commission on Isotopic Abundances and Atomic Weights
- Complex
- Compound
- Combustion pipette
- Computational chemistry
- Concentration
- Condensation polymer
- Condensation reaction
- Cooperite
- Copper
- Corderoite
- Cordierite
- Corrin
- Corrosion
- Corundum
- Cosmetics
- Covalent bond
- Covalent radius
- Covellite
- Crocidolite
- Crookesite
- Cryolite
- Crystal
- Crystal structure
- Cubic metre per mole
- Cumene process
- Cuprite
- Curium
- Cyanide
- Cyclopentadiene
- Cylindrite
- Cymophane
- Cytosine

== D ==
- D-block
- Darmstadtium
- Datolite
- Decay energy
- Decay mode
- Decay product
- Decomposition temperature
- Delessite
- Density
- Deposition
- Derek Harold Richard Barton
- Deuterium
- Diamond
- Diaspore
- Diatomite
- Diffusion pump
- Diopside
- Diorite
- Dipole
- Discovery of the chemical elements
- Distillation
- Dmitriy Mendeleyev
- Dolomite
- Donald J. Cram
- Dorothy Crowfoot Hodgkin
- Dubnium
- Dudley R. Herschbach
- Dysprosium

== E ==
- Eduard Buchner
- Edwin Mattison McMillan
- Einsteinium
- Electrical conductivity
- Electricity
- Electrochemical cell
- Electrochemistry
- Electrode
- Electrode potential
- Electrolysis
- Electrolyte
- Electrolytic cell
- Electromagnetic spectroscopy
- Electron
- Electron capture
- Electron configuration
- Electron shell
- Electron volt
- Electronegativity
- Electrophile
- Element
- Element symbol
- Elements song
- Elias James Corey
- Emerald
- Emil Hermann Fischer
- Emil Knoevenagel
- Emulsion
- Energy level
- Enthalpy
- Entropy
- Environmental chemistry
- Enzyme
- Epidiorite
- Epinephrine
- Epoxyethane
- Epsom salt
- Erbium
- Ernest Rutherford
- Ernst Otto Fischer
- Ester
- Ethanol
- Ethene
- Ether
- Europium
- Euxenite
- Explosive

== F ==
- F-block
- F-orbital
- F. Sherwood Rowland
- Fahrenheit
- Fat
- Feldspar
- Felsic
- Ferberite
- Fergusonite
- Fermium
- Ferrocene
- Filtration
- Flerovium
- Flint
- Fluorapatite
- Fluorescence spectroscopy
- Fluorine
- Fluorite
- Fluorspar
- Formaldehyde
- Formic acid
- Fractional freezing
- Francis William Aston
- Francium
- Francois Auguste Victor Grignard
- Franckeite
- Franklinite
- Franz Joseph Emil Fischer
- Frederick Sanger
- Frederick Soddy
- Freezing point
- Friedrich Bergius
- Friedrich Woehler
- Fritz Haber
- Fritz Pregl
- Frédéric Joliot
- Functional group
- Fur

== G ==
- G-block
- Gabbro
- Gadolinite
- Gadolinium
- Galena
- Gallium
- Gallium arsenide
- Gallylene
- Garnet
- Gas
- Gaseous
- Gedanite
- Geometric isomerism
- Geoffrey Wilkinson
- Georg Wittig
- George A. Olah
- George de Hevesy
- George Porter
- Gerhard Herzberg
- Germanite
- Germanium
- Gibbsite
- Gilbert Stork
- Giulio Natta
- Glauconite
- Glenn T. Seaborg
- Glessite
- Glucose
- Glycerine
- Glycine
- Gneiss
- Goethite
- Gold
- Granite
- Graphite
- Group 1 element
- Group 10 element
- Group 12 element
- Group 2 element
- Group 3 element
- Group 4 element
- Group 5 element
- Group 6 element
- Group 7 element
- Group 8 element
- Group 9 element
- Gypsum

== H ==
- H. M. Rouell
- Hafnium
- Half-life
- Halite
- Halogen
- Halogenoalkane
- Hans Fischer
- Hans Karl August Simon von Euler-Chelpin
- Harold Clayton Urey
- Harold Kroto
- Hartmut Michel
- Hassium
- Heat
- Heat of fusion
- Heat of vaporization
- Heavy metal (chemistry)
- Heinrich Otto Wieland
- Helium
- Hematite
- Hemoglobin
- Henri Louis le Chatelier
- Henri Moissan
- Henry Taube
- Heptane
- Herbert A. Hauptman
- Herbert C. Brown
- Hermann Emil Fischer
- Hermann Staudinger
- Heterocyclic compound
- Hexane
- Hiddenite
- Hideki Shirakawa
- High performance liquid chromatography
- Histidine
- Holmium
- Hornblende
- Hübnerite
- Humphry Davy
- Hund's rule
- Hutchinsonite
- Hyalite
- Hydrazine
- Hydrocarbon
- Hydrochloric acid
- Hydrogen
- Hydrogen bond
- Hydrogen cyanide
- Hydrogen peroxide
- Hydrogen sulfide
- Hydrolysis
- Hydroxide
- Hydroxyl
- Hyperconjugation

== I ==
- Ice
- Idocrase
- Illite
- Ilmenite
- Ilya Prigogine
- Indium
- Infrared spectroscopy
- Inorganic chemistry
- Intermolecular force
- International Temperature Scale
- International Union of Pure and Applied Chemistry (IUPAC)
- Iodine
- Ion
- Ionic bond
- Ionization potential
- Irène Joliot-Curie
- Iridium
- Iron
- Iron (III) oxide
- Irving Langmuir
- Isocyanate
- Isomer
- Isoprene
- Isotope
- Isotope table (complete)
- Isotope table (divided)
- Israel Shahak
- IUPAC

== J ==
- J. H. van 't Hoff
- Jade
- James Batcheller Sumner
- James Dewar
- Jaroslav Heyrovský
- Jasper
- Jean-Marie Lehn
- Jens C. Skou
- Jerome Karle
- Johan August Arfwedson
- Johan Gadolin
- Johann Deisenhofer
- Johann Friedrich Wilhelm Adolf von Baeyer
- Johann Wolfgang Döbereiner
- Johannes Diderik van der Waals
- John Pople
- John Alexander Reina Newlands
- John C. Polanyi
- John Cowdery Kendrew
- John Dalton
- John E. Walker
- John Ernest Walker
- John Bennett Fenn
- John Howard Northrop
- John Pople
- John Warcup Cornforth
- Jöns Jakob Berzelius
- Joseph Priestley
- Joule per kilogram-kelvin
- Justus von Liebig

== K ==
- K. Barry Sharpless
- Kainite
- Kalsilite
- Kamacite
- Kaolinite
- Karl Ziegler
- Kary Mullis
- Keilhauite
- Kelvin
- Kenichi Fukui
- Kernite
- Ketone
- Kilogram per cubic metre
- Kilojoule per mole
- Kimberlite
- Kinetics
- Kobellite
- Koichi Tanaka
- Krantzite
- Krypton
- Kunzite
- Kurt Alder
- Kurt Wüthrich
- Kyanite

== L ==
- Labradorite
- Lactic acid
- Lanthanide
- Lanthanum
- Lapis lazuli
- Lars Onsager
- Lawrencium
- Lazurite
- Le Chatelier's principle
- Lead
- Leopold Ružička
- Lepidolite
- Leucite
- Lewis acid
- Lewis base
- Ligand
- Lignite
- Limestone
- Limonite
- Linus Pauling
- Liquid
- Lise Meitner
- List of alchemical substances
- List of alloys
- List of biochemistry topics
- List of biomolecules
- List of chemists
- List of compounds
- List of elements by name
- List of elements by number
- List of elements by symbol
- List of elements named after people
- List of elements named after places
- List of inorganic compounds
- List of organic compounds
- List of scientific journals in chemistry
- Lithium
- Liver
- Livermorium
- Livingstonite
- Lodestone
- Lonsdaleite
- Lorandite
- Lord Todd
- Lothar Meyer
- Louis Pasteur
- Luis F. Leloir
- Lutetium

== M ==
- Magnesite
- Magnesium
- Magnesium(I) dimer
- Magnetic resonance
- Magnetism
- Magnetite
- Malachite
- Malacolite
- Manfred Eigen
- Manganese
- Marble
- Marcasite
- Marie Curie
- Mario J. Molina
- Marl
- Mass
- Mass spectrometer
- Materials science
- Max Ferdinand Perutz
- Medicine
- Meerschaum
- Mega-
- Meitnerium
- Melting point
- Melvin Calvin
- Mendelevium
- Mendozite
- Menilite
- Mercury (II) sulfide
- Mercury (I) chloride
- Mercury (element)
- Mercury (II) chloride
- Mercury fulminate
- Mercury-vapor lamp
- Metacinnabarite
- Metal
- Metal halide
- Metallic bond
- Metalloid
- Metamerism
- Methane
- Methanol
- Methyl
- Methyl group
- Methyl isocyanate
- Methylene
- Methylene bridge
- Methylene group
- Methyllithium
- Methylmercury
- Metre per second
- Mica
- Michael Faraday
- Michael Smith (chemist)
- Microcline
- Milk quartz
- Millinery
- Mineral
- Mineralogy
- Mixture
- Mohs hardness scale
- Molar mass
- Molar volume
- Mole (unit)
- Molecular dynamics
- Molecular mechanics
- Molecular modeling
- Molecular orbital
- Molecule
- Molybdenite
- Molybdenum
- Molybdenum disulfide
- Monazite
- Morganite
- Moscovium
- Mössbauer spectroscopy
- Muscovite
- Mustard gas

== N ==
- Naphthalene
- Natural abundance
- Neodymium
- Neon
- Nepheline
- Neptunium
- Nernst equation
- Neutron
- Neutron activation analysis
- Nickel
- Nihonium
- Nikolay Nikolaevich Semenov
- Nils Gabriel Sefström
- Niobite
- Niobite-tantalite
- Niobium
- Nitrate
- Nitric acid
- Nitric oxide
- Nitrogen
- Nitrogen dioxide
- Nitroglycerine
- Nitrous oxide
- Nobel Prize in Chemistry
- Nobelium
- Noble gas
- Nonmetal
- Nuclear magnetic resonance
- Nucleic Acid
- Nucleophile

== O ==
- Octane
- Odd Hassel
- Oganesson
- Ohm
- Olivine
- Onium ion
- Opal
- Optical isomerism
- Organic chemistry
- Organic compound
- Organic nomenclature
- Organic reaction
- Organic synthesis
- Organolithium reagent
- Orthoclase
- Osmium
- Osmium tetroxide
- Otto Hahn
- Otto Paul Hermann Diels
- Otto Wallach
- Oxidation
- Oxidation number
- Oxidation state
- Oxide
- Oxygen

== P ==
- P-block
- Paint
- Palagonite
- Palladium
- Parabens
- Partial pressure
- Pascal (unit)
- Paul Berg
- Paul D. Boyer
- Paul J. Crutzen
- Paul J. Flory
- Paul Karrer
- Paul Sabatier
- Pauling scale
- Pegmatite
- Pentlandite
- Peptide
- Perchlorate
- Peridotite
- Period 1 element
- Period 2 element
- Period 3 element
- Period 4 element
- Period 5 element
- Period 6 element
- Period 7 element
- Period 8 element
- Periodic table
- Periodic table block
- Periodic table group
- Periodic table period
- Periodic table series
- Periodic table (big)
- Periodic table (electron configurations)
- Periodic table (extended)
- Periodic table (large version)
- Periodic table (metals and non-metals)
- Periodic table (standard)
- Periodicity
- Perlite
- Pesticide
- Petalite
- Peter D. Mitchell
- Peter Debye
- PH
- Phenacite
- Phenol
- Phenyl
- Phlogopite
- Phosphoric acid
- Phosphorite
- Phosphorus
- Phosphorus porphyrin
- Phthalates
- Phyllite
- Physical chemistry
- Physics
- Picometre
- Picric acid
- Plagioclase
- Platinum
- Plutonium
- PMDTT
- Pnictogen
- Pollucite
- Pollution
- Polonium
- Polymer
- Polymerization
- Porphyrin
- Post-transition metal
- Potassium
- Potassium nitrate
- Pourbaix diagram
- Praseodymium
- Prehnite
- Promethium
- Propane
- Protactinium
- Protein
- Proton
- Pumice
- Pumicite
- Purine
- Putrescine
- Pyridine
- Pyrimidine
- Pyrite
- Pyrochlore
- Pyroluria
- Pyroxene
- Pyrrole

== Q ==
- Quantitative analysis
- Quantum chemistry
- Quartz
- Quartzite

== R ==
- Radical (chemistry)
- Radioisotope
- Radium
- Radon
- Radon difluoride
- Raman spectroscopy
- Raoult's law
- Redox
- Reduction
- Reflux
- Reversible reaction
- Rhazes
- Rhenium
- Rhodium
- Rhyolite
- Rhyolitic
- Richard Adolf Zsigmondy
- Richard Kuhn
- Richard Laurence Millington Synge
- Richard Martin Willstätter
- Richard R. Ernst
- Richard Smalley
- Riebeckite
- Roald Hoffmann
- Robert Bruce Merrifield
- Robert Burns Woodward
- Robert Curl
- Robert G. Parr
- Robert Huber
- Robert S. Mulliken
- Robert Wilhelm Bunsen
- Rock crystal
- Roentgenium
- Ronald George Wreyford Norrish
- Rose quartz
- Roumanite
- Rubidium
- Ruby
- Rudolph A. Marcus
- Rudolph Pariser
- Ruthenium
- Rutherfordium
- Rutile
- Ryōji Noyori

== S ==
- S-block
- S-orbital
- S.P.L. Sørensen
- Salt
- Salvinorin-A
- Samarium
- Samarskite
- Sand
- Sanger–Black apparatus
- Sapphire
- Sard
- Scandium
- Scheelite
- Schist
- Scientific notation
- Seaborgium
- Selenium
- Semiconductor
- Serpentine
- SI
- Sidney Altman
- Silane
- Silicon
- Silicon dioxide
- Sillimanite
- Simple aromatic rings
- Silver
- Simetite
- Sir Cyril Norman Hinshelwood
- Sir Robert Robinson
- Sir William Ramsay
- Skeletal formula
- Skin
- Smectite
- Smoky quartz
- Soapstone
- Soda niter
- Sodium
- Sodium bicarbonate
- Sodium carbonate
- Sodium chloride
- Sodium citrate
- Sodium cyanide
- Sodium hydroxide
- Sodium hypochlorite
- Solid
- Solid state chemistry
- Soluble
- Soluene
- solution
- Solvent
- Solvation
- Solvent
- Species
- Specific heat capacity
- Spectroscopy
- Speed of sound
- Sperrylite
- Spinel
- Spodumene
- Stable isotope
- Standard temperature and pressure
- Standard Ambient Temperature and Pressure
- Stanford Moore
- Stannite
- Stantienite
- State of matter
- Staurolite
- Steatite
- Stereochemistry
- Stoichiometry
- Strontianite
- Strontium
- Structural formula
- Sublimation
- Sulfate
- Sulfur
- Sulfur dioxide
- Sulfuric acid
- Superconductor
- Surface chemistry
- Suspension (chemistry)
- Svante Arrhenius
- Syenite
- Sylvite
- Synthetic radioisotope
- Systematic element name

== T ==
- Tabun
- Talc
- Talcum
- Tantalite
- Tantalum
- Tanzanite
- Teallite
- Technetium
- Telluride
- Tellurium
- Tennessine
- Terbium
- Tetryl
- Thallium
- Theodor Svedberg
- Theodore William Richards
- Thermal conductivity
- Thermochemistry
- Thermometer
- Thiamin
- Thioether
- Thiol
- Thomas Graham
- Thomas R. Cech
- Thorium
- Thortveitite
- Thulium
- Timeline of biology and organic chemistry
- Tin
- Titanite
- Titanium
- Titanium dioxide
- Titration
- Toluene
- Topaz
- Tourmaline
- Toxic
- Transition metal
- Tremolite
- Trinitrotoluene
- Triple point
- Troctolite
- Tuff
- Tungsten
- Turquoise
- Tutty
- Tyrosine

== U ==
- Ulexite
- UN number
- Uralite
- Uraninite
- Uranium
- Urea
- Uric acid
- UV/VIS spectroscopy

== V ==
- Valence
- Van der Waals radius
- Van der Waals force
- Vanadium
- Vapor pressure
- Vapour pressure
- Vermilion
- Victor Grignard
- Viktor Meyer
- Vincent du Vigneaud
- Vinyl
- Vladimir Prelog
- Vladimir Vasilevich Markovnikov

== W ==
- Walter Gilbert
- Walter Kohn
- Walter Norman Haworth
- Walther Hermann Nernst
- Water
- Watt per metre-kelvin
- Wendell Meredith Stanley
- Wilhelm Ostwald
- Willard Frank Libby
- Willemite
- William Francis Giauque
- William H. Stein
- William Hardin Graham
- William Hyde Wollaston
- William Lipscomb
- William Perkin
- William S. Knowles
- Wiserine
- Wolframite
- Wollastonite
- WorldWide Molecular Matrix

== X ==
- X-ray photoelectron spectroscopy
- Xenon
- Xenotime

== Y ==
- YBCO
- Ytterbium
- Yttria
- Yttrium
- Yuan T. Lee

== Z ==
- Zeolite
- Zinc
- Zinnwaldite
- Zircon
- Zirconium
- Zone melting
- Zyklon B
- Zymurgy
