= Magnetic resonance (disambiguation) =

Magnetic resonance can mean:

- Magnetic resonance, a physical process

== Physics ==
- Magnetic resonance (quantum mechanics), a quantum resonance process
- Nuclear magnetic resonance, a special case
- Electron paramagnetic resonance
- Nuclear magnetic resonance quantum computer

== Medicine ==
- Magnetic resonance imaging (MRI), a medical imaging technique
  - Functional magnetic resonance imaging (fMRI), an MRI technique to measure brain activity
  - Magnetic resonance neurography (MRN), an MRI technique to image nerves
  - Cardiac magnetic resonance imaging (CMR), an MRI technique to assess the cardiovascular system
  - Magnetic resonance angiography (MRA), an MRI technique to image blood vessels
  - Magnetic resonance cholangiopancreatography (MRCP), an MRI technique to image biliary and pancreatic ducts
  - Endorectal coil magnetic resonance imaging, an MRI technique to image the area surrounding the rectum
  - Delayed gadolinium-enhanced magnetic resonance imaging of cartilage (dGEMRIC), an MRI technique to image cartilage
  - Magnetic resonance elastography (MRE), an MRI technique to measure tissue stiffness
  - Interventional magnetic resonance imaging (IMRI) a technique using MRI to guide medical interventions
  - Magnetic resonance spectroscopic imaging, an MRI technique to gather cellular activity and metabolic information
- Magnetic resonance therapy, a proposed treatment based on the principles of magnetic resonance

== Spectroscopy ==
- Nuclear magnetic resonance spectroscopy, a technique to determine properties of atoms or molecules
  - Two-dimensional nuclear magnetic resonance spectroscopy
  - Nuclear magnetic resonance spectroscopy of proteins
  - Nuclear magnetic resonance spectroscopy of carbohydrates
  - Nuclear magnetic resonance spectroscopy of nucleic acids
  - In vivo magnetic resonance spectroscopy
  - Solid-state nuclear magnetic resonance spectroscopy
  - Triple-resonance nuclear magnetic resonance spectroscopy
  - Nuclear magnetic resonance decoupling
  - Nuclear magnetic resonance crystallography
- Electron paramagnetic resonance spectroscopy, a technique to study materials with unpaired electrons
  - Pulsed electron paramagnetic resonance
- Ferromagnetic resonance, a technique to study ferromagnetic materials

== Microscopy ==
- Magnetic resonance microscopy, an MRI technique used down to the scale of 5-10 cubic micrometers
- Magnetic resonance force microscopy, an MRI technique used on nanometer and smaller scales

== Other uses ==
- Magnetic Resonance Imaging (journal)
- Magnetic Resonance in Medicine, journal
- Magnetic Resonance in Chemistry, journal
- Erwin L. Hahn institute for magnetic resonance imaging, in Essen, Germany
