= Magnetic resonance =

Excitation of a quantum system via magnetism

Magnetic resonance is a process by which a physical excitation (resonance) is set up via magnetism.

This process was used to develop magnetic resonance imaging (MRI) and nuclear magnetic resonance spectroscopy (NMRS) technology.

It is also being used to develop nuclear magnetic resonance quantum computers.

== History ==
The first observation of electron-spin resonance was in 1944 by Y. K. Zavosky, a Soviet physicist then teaching at Kazan State University (now Kazan Federal University). Nuclear magnetic resonance was first observed in 1946 in the US by a team led by Felix Bloch at the same time as a separate team led by Edward Mills Purcell, the two of whom would later be the 1952 Nobel Laureates in Physics.

== Resonant and non-resonant methods ==
A natural way to measure the separation between two energy levels is to find a measurable quantity defined by this separation and measure it. However, the precision of this method is limited by measurement precision and thus may be poor.

Alternatively, we can set up an experiment in which the system's behavior depends on the energy level. If we apply an external field of controlled frequency, we can measure the level separation by noting at which frequency a qualitative change happens: that would mean that at this frequency, the transition between two states has a high probability. An example of such an experiment is a variation of Stern–Gerlach experiment, in which magnetic moment is measured by finding resonance frequency for the transition between two spin states.

== See also ==
- Resonant inductive coupling, a method of transferring electrical power
- Magnetic resonance (quantum mechanics), a quantum resonance process
- Nuclear magnetic resonance, a special case
- Giant resonance
- Electron paramagnetic resonance
