= Electron configurations of the elements =

Chemical data page

This page shows the electron configurations of the neutral gaseous atoms in their ground states. For each atom the subshells are given first in concise form, then with all subshells written out, followed by the number of electrons per shell. For phosphorus (element 15) as an example, the concise form is [Ne] 3s^{2} 3p^{3}. Here [Ne] refers to the core electrons which are the same as for the element neon (Ne), the last noble gas before phosphorus in the periodic table. The valence electrons (here 3s^{2} 3p^{3}) are written explicitly for all atoms.

Electron configurations of elements beyond hassium (element 108) have never been measured; predictions are used below.

As an approximate rule, electron configurations are given by the Aufbau principle and the Madelung rule. However there are numerous exceptions; for example the lightest exception is chromium, which would be predicted to have the configuration 1s^{2} 2s^{2} 2p^{6} 3s^{2} 3p^{6} 3d^{4} 4s^{2}, written as [Ar] 3d^{4} 4s^{2}, but whose actual configuration given in the table below is [Ar] 3d^{5} 4s^{1}.

Note that these electron configurations are given for neutral atoms in the gas phase, which are not the same as the electron configurations for the same atoms in chemical environments. In many cases, multiple configurations are within a small range of energies and the irregularities shown below do not necessarily have a clear relation to chemical behaviour. For the undiscovered eighth-row elements, mixing of configurations is expected to be very important, and sometimes the result can no longer be well-described by a single configuration.

Legend
1s	2s	2p	3s	3p	3d	4s	4p	4d	4f	5s	5p	5d	5f	6s	6p	6d	7s	7p
1 H hydrogen : 1s^{1}
1s^{1}																		
1																		
2 He helium : 1s^{2}
1s^{2}																		
2																		
3 Li lithium : [He] 2s^{1}
1s^{2}	2s^{1}																	
2	1																	
4 Be beryllium : [He] 2s^{2}
1s^{2}	2s^{2}																	
2	2																	
5 B boron : [He] 2s^{2} 2p^{1}
1s^{2}	2s^{2}	2p^{1}																
2	3																	
6 C carbon : [He] 2s^{2} 2p^{2}
1s^{2}	2s^{2}	2p^{2}																
2	4																	
7 N nitrogen : [He] 2s^{2} 2p^{3}
1s^{2}	2s^{2}	2p^{3}																
2	5																	
8 O oxygen : [He] 2s^{2} 2p^{4}
1s^{2}	2s^{2}	2p^{4}																
2	6																	
9 F fluorine : [He] 2s^{2} 2p^{5}
1s^{2}	2s^{2}	2p^{5}																
2	7																	
10 Ne neon : [He] 2s^{2} 2p^{6}
1s^{2}	2s^{2}	2p^{6}																
2	8																	
11 Na sodium : [Ne] 3s^{1}
1s^{2}	2s^{2}	2p^{6}	3s^{1}															
2	8		1															
12 Mg magnesium : [Ne] 3s^{2}
1s^{2}	2s^{2}	2p^{6}	3s^{2}															
2	8		2															
13 Al aluminium : [Ne] 3s^{2} 3p^{1}
1s^{2}	2s^{2}	2p^{6}	3s^{2}	3p^{1}														
2	8		3															
14 Si silicon : [Ne] 3s^{2} 3p^{2}
1s^{2}	2s^{2}	2p^{6}	3s^{2}	3p^{2}														
2	8		4															
15 P phosphorus : [Ne] 3s^{2} 3p^{3}
1s^{2}	2s^{2}	2p^{6}	3s^{2}	3p^{3}														
2	8		5															
16 S sulfur : [Ne] 3s^{2} 3p^{4}
1s^{2}	2s^{2}	2p^{6}	3s^{2}	3p^{4}														
2	8		6															
17 Cl chlorine : [Ne] 3s^{2} 3p^{5}
1s^{2}	2s^{2}	2p^{6}	3s^{2}	3p^{5}														
2	8		7															
18 Ar argon : [Ne] 3s^{2} 3p^{6}
1s^{2}	2s^{2}	2p^{6}	3s^{2}	3p^{6}														
2	8		8															
19 K potassium : [Ar] 4s^{1}
1s^{2}	2s^{2}	2p^{6}	3s^{2}	3p^{6}		4s^{1}												
2	8		8			1												
20 Ca calcium : [Ar] 4s^{2}
1s^{2}	2s^{2}	2p^{6}	3s^{2}	3p^{6}		4s^{2}												
2	8		8			2												
21 Sc scandium : [Ar] 3d^{1} 4s^{2}
1s^{2}	2s^{2}	2p^{6}	3s^{2}	3p^{6}	3d^{1}	4s^{2}												
2	8		9			2												
22 Ti titanium : [Ar] 3d^{2} 4s^{2}
1s^{2}	2s^{2}	2p^{6}	3s^{2}	3p^{6}	3d^{2}	4s^{2}												
2	8		10			2												
23 V vanadium : [Ar] 3d^{3} 4s^{2}
1s^{2}	2s^{2}	2p^{6}	3s^{2}	3p^{6}	3d^{3}	4s^{2}												
2	8		11			2												
24 Cr chromium : [Ar] 3d^{5} 4s^{1}
1s^{2}	2s^{2}	2p^{6}	3s^{2}	3p^{6}	3d^{5}	4s^{1}												
2	8		13			1												
25 Mn manganese : [Ar] 3d^{5} 4s^{2}
1s^{2}	2s^{2}	2p^{6}	3s^{2}	3p^{6}	3d^{5}	4s^{2}												
2	8		13			2												
26 Fe iron : [Ar] 3d^{6} 4s^{2}
1s^{2}	2s^{2}	2p^{6}	3s^{2}	3p^{6}	3d^{6}	4s^{2}												
2	8		14			2												
27 Co cobalt : [Ar] 3d^{7} 4s^{2}
1s^{2}	2s^{2}	2p^{6}	3s^{2}	3p^{6}	3d^{7}	4s^{2}												
2	8		15			2												
28 Ni nickel : [Ar] 3d^{8} 4s^{2}
1s^{2}	2s^{2}	2p^{6}	3s^{2}	3p^{6}	3d^{8}	4s^{2}												
2	8		16			2												
29 Cu copper : [Ar] 3d^{10} 4s^{1}
1s^{2}	2s^{2}	2p^{6}	3s^{2}	3p^{6}	3d^{10}	4s^{1}												
2	8		18			1												
30 Zn zinc : [Ar] 3d^{10} 4s^{2}
1s^{2}	2s^{2}	2p^{6}	3s^{2}	3p^{6}	3d^{10}	4s^{2}												
2	8		18			2												
31 Ga gallium : [Ar] 3d^{10} 4s^{2} 4p^{1}
1s^{2}	2s^{2}	2p^{6}	3s^{2}	3p^{6}	3d^{10}	4s^{2}	4p^{1}											
2	8		18			3												
32 Ge germanium : [Ar] 3d^{10} 4s^{2} 4p^{2}
1s^{2}	2s^{2}	2p^{6}	3s^{2}	3p^{6}	3d^{10}	4s^{2}	4p^{2}											
2	8		18			4												
33 As arsenic : [Ar] 3d^{10} 4s^{2} 4p^{3}
1s^{2}	2s^{2}	2p^{6}	3s^{2}	3p^{6}	3d^{10}	4s^{2}	4p^{3}											
2	8		18			5												
34 Se selenium : [Ar] 3d^{10} 4s^{2} 4p^{4}
1s^{2}	2s^{2}	2p^{6}	3s^{2}	3p^{6}	3d^{10}	4s^{2}	4p^{4}											
2	8		18			6												
35 Br bromine : [Ar] 3d^{10} 4s^{2} 4p^{5}
1s^{2}	2s^{2}	2p^{6}	3s^{2}	3p^{6}	3d^{10}	4s^{2}	4p^{5}											
2	8		18			7												
36 Kr krypton : [Ar] 3d^{10} 4s^{2} 4p^{6}
1s^{2}	2s^{2}	2p^{6}	3s^{2}	3p^{6}	3d^{10}	4s^{2}	4p^{6}											
2	8		18			8												
37 Rb rubidium : [Kr] 5s^{1}
1s^{2}	2s^{2}	2p^{6}	3s^{2}	3p^{6}	3d^{10}	4s^{2}	4p^{6}			5s^{1}								
2	8		18			8				1								
38 Sr strontium : [Kr] 5s^{2}
1s^{2}	2s^{2}	2p^{6}	3s^{2}	3p^{6}	3d^{10}	4s^{2}	4p^{6}			5s^{2}								
2	8		18			8				2								
39 Y yttrium : [Kr] 4d^{1} 5s^{2}
1s^{2}	2s^{2}	2p^{6}	3s^{2}	3p^{6}	3d^{10}	4s^{2}	4p^{6}	4d^{1}		5s^{2}								
2	8		18			9				2								
40 Zr zirconium : [Kr] 4d^{2} 5s^{2}
1s^{2}	2s^{2}	2p^{6}	3s^{2}	3p^{6}	3d^{10}	4s^{2}	4p^{6}	4d^{2}		5s^{2}								
2	8		18			10				2								
41 Nb niobium : [Kr] 4d^{4} 5s^{1}
1s^{2}	2s^{2}	2p^{6}	3s^{2}	3p^{6}	3d^{10}	4s^{2}	4p^{6}	4d^{4}		5s^{1}								
2	8		18			12				1								
42 Mo molybdenum : [Kr] 4d^{5} 5s^{1}
1s^{2}	2s^{2}	2p^{6}	3s^{2}	3p^{6}	3d^{10}	4s^{2}	4p^{6}	4d^{5}		5s^{1}								
2	8		18			13				1								
43 Tc technetium : [Kr] 4d^{5} 5s^{2}
1s^{2}	2s^{2}	2p^{6}	3s^{2}	3p^{6}	3d^{10}	4s^{2}	4p^{6}	4d^{5}		5s^{2}								
2	8		18			13				2								
44 Ru ruthenium : [Kr] 4d^{7} 5s^{1}
1s^{2}	2s^{2}	2p^{6}	3s^{2}	3p^{6}	3d^{10}	4s^{2}	4p^{6}	4d^{7}		5s^{1}								
2	8		18			15				1								
45 Rh rhodium : [Kr] 4d^{8} 5s^{1}
1s^{2}	2s^{2}	2p^{6}	3s^{2}	3p^{6}	3d^{10}	4s^{2}	4p^{6}	4d^{8}		5s^{1}								
2	8		18			16				1								
46 Pd palladium : [Kr] 4d^{10}
1s^{2}	2s^{2}	2p^{6}	3s^{2}	3p^{6}	3d^{10}	4s^{2}	4p^{6}	4d^{10}										
2	8		18			18												
47 Ag silver : [Kr] 4d^{10} 5s^{1}
1s^{2}	2s^{2}	2p^{6}	3s^{2}	3p^{6}	3d^{10}	4s^{2}	4p^{6}	4d^{10}		5s^{1}								
2	8		18			18				1								
48 Cd cadmium : [Kr] 4d^{10} 5s^{2}
1s^{2}	2s^{2}	2p^{6}	3s^{2}	3p^{6}	3d^{10}	4s^{2}	4p^{6}	4d^{10}		5s^{2}								
2	8		18			18				2								
49 In indium : [Kr] 4d^{10} 5s^{2} 5p^{1}
1s^{2}	2s^{2}	2p^{6}	3s^{2}	3p^{6}	3d^{10}	4s^{2}	4p^{6}	4d^{10}		5s^{2}	5p^{1}							
2	8		18			18				3								
50 Sn tin : [Kr] 4d^{10} 5s^{2} 5p^{2}
1s^{2}	2s^{2}	2p^{6}	3s^{2}	3p^{6}	3d^{10}	4s^{2}	4p^{6}	4d^{10}		5s^{2}	5p^{2}							
2	8		18			18				4								
51 Sb antimony : [Kr] 4d^{10} 5s^{2} 5p^{3}
1s^{2}	2s^{2}	2p^{6}	3s^{2}	3p^{6}	3d^{10}	4s^{2}	4p^{6}	4d^{10}		5s^{2}	5p^{3}							
2	8		18			18				5								
52 Te tellurium : [Kr] 4d^{10} 5s^{2} 5p^{4}
1s^{2}	2s^{2}	2p^{6}	3s^{2}	3p^{6}	3d^{10}	4s^{2}	4p^{6}	4d^{10}		5s^{2}	5p^{4}							
2	8		18			18				6								
53 I iodine : [Kr] 4d^{10} 5s^{2} 5p^{5}
1s^{2}	2s^{2}	2p^{6}	3s^{2}	3p^{6}	3d^{10}	4s^{2}	4p^{6}	4d^{10}		5s^{2}	5p^{5}							
2	8		18			18				7								
54 Xe xenon : [Kr] 4d^{10} 5s^{2} 5p^{6}
1s^{2}	2s^{2}	2p^{6}	3s^{2}	3p^{6}	3d^{10}	4s^{2}	4p^{6}	4d^{10}		5s^{2}	5p^{6}							
2	8		18			18				8								
55 Cs caesium : [Xe] 6s^{1}
1s^{2}	2s^{2}	2p^{6}	3s^{2}	3p^{6}	3d^{10}	4s^{2}	4p^{6}	4d^{10}		5s^{2}	5p^{6}			6s^{1}				
2	8		18			18				8				1				
56 Ba barium : [Xe] 6s^{2}
1s^{2}	2s^{2}	2p^{6}	3s^{2}	3p^{6}	3d^{10}	4s^{2}	4p^{6}	4d^{10}		5s^{2}	5p^{6}			6s^{2}				
2	8		18			18				8				2				
57 La lanthanum : [Xe] 5d^{1} 6s^{2}
1s^{2}	2s^{2}	2p^{6}	3s^{2}	3p^{6}	3d^{10}	4s^{2}	4p^{6}	4d^{10}		5s^{2}	5p^{6}	5d^{1}		6s^{2}				
2	8		18			18				9				2				
58 Ce cerium : [Xe] 4f^{1} 5d^{1} 6s^{2}
1s^{2}	2s^{2}	2p^{6}	3s^{2}	3p^{6}	3d^{10}	4s^{2}	4p^{6}	4d^{10}	4f^{1}	5s^{2}	5p^{6}	5d^{1}		6s^{2}				
2	8		18			19				9				2				
59 Pr praseodymium : [Xe] 4f^{3} 6s^{2}
1s^{2}	2s^{2}	2p^{6}	3s^{2}	3p^{6}	3d^{10}	4s^{2}	4p^{6}	4d^{10}	4f^{3}	5s^{2}	5p^{6}			6s^{2}				
2	8		18			21				8				2				
60 Nd neodymium : [Xe] 4f^{4} 6s^{2}
1s^{2}	2s^{2}	2p^{6}	3s^{2}	3p^{6}	3d^{10}	4s^{2}	4p^{6}	4d^{10}	4f^{4}	5s^{2}	5p^{6}			6s^{2}				
2	8		18			22				8				2				
61 Pm promethium : [Xe] 4f^{5} 6s^{2}
1s^{2}	2s^{2}	2p^{6}	3s^{2}	3p^{6}	3d^{10}	4s^{2}	4p^{6}	4d^{10}	4f^{5}	5s^{2}	5p^{6}			6s^{2}				
2	8		18			23				8				2				
62 Sm samarium : [Xe] 4f^{6} 6s^{2}
1s^{2}	2s^{2}	2p^{6}	3s^{2}	3p^{6}	3d^{10}	4s^{2}	4p^{6}	4d^{10}	4f^{6}	5s^{2}	5p^{6}			6s^{2}				
2	8		18			24				8				2				
63 Eu europium : [Xe] 4f^{7} 6s^{2}
1s^{2}	2s^{2}	2p^{6}	3s^{2}	3p^{6}	3d^{10}	4s^{2}	4p^{6}	4d^{10}	4f^{7}	5s^{2}	5p^{6}			6s^{2}				
2	8		18			25				8				2				
64 Gd gadolinium : [Xe] 4f^{7} 5d^{1} 6s^{2}
1s^{2}	2s^{2}	2p^{6}	3s^{2}	3p^{6}	3d^{10}	4s^{2}	4p^{6}	4d^{10}	4f^{7}	5s^{2}	5p^{6}	5d^{1}		6s^{2}				
2	8		18			25				9				2				
65 Tb terbium : [Xe] 4f^{9} 6s^{2}
1s^{2}	2s^{2}	2p^{6}	3s^{2}	3p^{6}	3d^{10}	4s^{2}	4p^{6}	4d^{10}	4f^{9}	5s^{2}	5p^{6}			6s^{2}				
2	8		18			27				8				2				
66 Dy dysprosium : [Xe] 4f^{10} 6s^{2}
1s^{2}	2s^{2}	2p^{6}	3s^{2}	3p^{6}	3d^{10}	4s^{2}	4p^{6}	4d^{10}	4f^{10}	5s^{2}	5p^{6}			6s^{2}				
2	8		18			28				8				2				
67 Ho holmium : [Xe] 4f^{11} 6s^{2}
1s^{2}	2s^{2}	2p^{6}	3s^{2}	3p^{6}	3d^{10}	4s^{2}	4p^{6}	4d^{10}	4f^{11}	5s^{2}	5p^{6}			6s^{2}				
2	8		18			29				8				2				
68 Er erbium : [Xe] 4f^{12} 6s^{2}
1s^{2}	2s^{2}	2p^{6}	3s^{2}	3p^{6}	3d^{10}	4s^{2}	4p^{6}	4d^{10}	4f^{12}	5s^{2}	5p^{6}			6s^{2}				
2	8		18			30				8				2				
69 Tm thulium : [Xe] 4f^{13} 6s^{2}
1s^{2}	2s^{2}	2p^{6}	3s^{2}	3p^{6}	3d^{10}	4s^{2}	4p^{6}	4d^{10}	4f^{13}	5s^{2}	5p^{6}			6s^{2}				
2	8		18			31				8				2				
70 Yb ytterbium : [Xe] 4f^{14} 6s^{2}
1s^{2}	2s^{2}	2p^{6}	3s^{2}	3p^{6}	3d^{10}	4s^{2}	4p^{6}	4d^{10}	4f^{14}	5s^{2}	5p^{6}			6s^{2}				
2	8		18			32				8				2				
71 Lu lutetium : [Xe] 4f^{14} 5d^{1} 6s^{2}
1s^{2}	2s^{2}	2p^{6}	3s^{2}	3p^{6}	3d^{10}	4s^{2}	4p^{6}	4d^{10}	4f^{14}	5s^{2}	5p^{6}	5d^{1}		6s^{2}				
2	8		18			32				9				2				
72 Hf hafnium : [Xe] 4f^{14} 5d^{2} 6s^{2}
1s^{2}	2s^{2}	2p^{6}	3s^{2}	3p^{6}	3d^{10}	4s^{2}	4p^{6}	4d^{10}	4f^{14}	5s^{2}	5p^{6}	5d^{2}		6s^{2}				
2	8		18			32				10				2				
73 Ta tantalum : [Xe] 4f^{14} 5d^{3} 6s^{2}
1s^{2}	2s^{2}	2p^{6}	3s^{2}	3p^{6}	3d^{10}	4s^{2}	4p^{6}	4d^{10}	4f^{14}	5s^{2}	5p^{6}	5d^{3}		6s^{2}				
2	8		18			32				11				2				
74 W tungsten : [Xe] 4f^{14} 5d^{4} 6s^{2}
1s^{2}	2s^{2}	2p^{6}	3s^{2}	3p^{6}	3d^{10}	4s^{2}	4p^{6}	4d^{10}	4f^{14}	5s^{2}	5p^{6}	5d^{4}		6s^{2}				
2	8		18			32				12				2				
75 Re rhenium : [Xe] 4f^{14} 5d^{5} 6s^{2}
1s^{2}	2s^{2}	2p^{6}	3s^{2}	3p^{6}	3d^{10}	4s^{2}	4p^{6}	4d^{10}	4f^{14}	5s^{2}	5p^{6}	5d^{5}		6s^{2}				
2	8		18			32				13				2				
76 Os osmium : [Xe] 4f^{14} 5d^{6} 6s^{2}
1s^{2}	2s^{2}	2p^{6}	3s^{2}	3p^{6}	3d^{10}	4s^{2}	4p^{6}	4d^{10}	4f^{14}	5s^{2}	5p^{6}	5d^{6}		6s^{2}				
2	8		18			32				14				2				
77 Ir iridium : [Xe] 4f^{14} 5d^{7} 6s^{2}
1s^{2}	2s^{2}	2p^{6}	3s^{2}	3p^{6}	3d^{10}	4s^{2}	4p^{6}	4d^{10}	4f^{14}	5s^{2}	5p^{6}	5d^{7}		6s^{2}				
2	8		18			32				15				2				
78 Pt platinum : [Xe] 4f^{14} 5d^{9} 6s^{1}
1s^{2}	2s^{2}	2p^{6}	3s^{2}	3p^{6}	3d^{10}	4s^{2}	4p^{6}	4d^{10}	4f^{14}	5s^{2}	5p^{6}	5d^{9}		6s^{1}				
2	8		18			32				17				1				
79 Au gold : [Xe] 4f^{14} 5d^{10} 6s^{1}
1s^{2}	2s^{2}	2p^{6}	3s^{2}	3p^{6}	3d^{10}	4s^{2}	4p^{6}	4d^{10}	4f^{14}	5s^{2}	5p^{6}	5d^{10}		6s^{1}				
2	8		18			32				18				1				
80 Hg mercury : [Xe] 4f^{14} 5d^{10} 6s^{2}
1s^{2}	2s^{2}	2p^{6}	3s^{2}	3p^{6}	3d^{10}	4s^{2}	4p^{6}	4d^{10}	4f^{14}	5s^{2}	5p^{6}	5d^{10}		6s^{2}				
2	8		18			32				18				2				
81 Tl thallium : [Xe] 4f^{14} 5d^{10} 6s^{2} 6p^{1}
1s^{2}	2s^{2}	2p^{6}	3s^{2}	3p^{6}	3d^{10}	4s^{2}	4p^{6}	4d^{10}	4f^{14}	5s^{2}	5p^{6}	5d^{10}		6s^{2}	6p^{1}			
2	8		18			32				18				3				
82 Pb lead : [Xe] 4f^{14} 5d^{10} 6s^{2} 6p^{2}
1s^{2}	2s^{2}	2p^{6}	3s^{2}	3p^{6}	3d^{10}	4s^{2}	4p^{6}	4d^{10}	4f^{14}	5s^{2}	5p^{6}	5d^{10}		6s^{2}	6p^{2}			
2	8		18			32				18				4				
83 Bi bismuth : [Xe] 4f^{14} 5d^{10} 6s^{2} 6p^{3}
1s^{2}	2s^{2}	2p^{6}	3s^{2}	3p^{6}	3d^{10}	4s^{2}	4p^{6}	4d^{10}	4f^{14}	5s^{2}	5p^{6}	5d^{10}		6s^{2}	6p^{3}			
2	8		18			32				18				5				
84 Po polonium : [Xe] 4f^{14} 5d^{10} 6s^{2} 6p^{4}
1s^{2}	2s^{2}	2p^{6}	3s^{2}	3p^{6}	3d^{10}	4s^{2}	4p^{6}	4d^{10}	4f^{14}	5s^{2}	5p^{6}	5d^{10}		6s^{2}	6p^{4}			
2	8		18			32				18				6				
85 At astatine : [Xe] 4f^{14} 5d^{10} 6s^{2} 6p^{5}
1s^{2}	2s^{2}	2p^{6}	3s^{2}	3p^{6}	3d^{10}	4s^{2}	4p^{6}	4d^{10}	4f^{14}	5s^{2}	5p^{6}	5d^{10}		6s^{2}	6p^{5}			
2	8		18			32				18				7				
86 Rn radon : [Xe] 4f^{14} 5d^{10} 6s^{2} 6p^{6}
1s^{2}	2s^{2}	2p^{6}	3s^{2}	3p^{6}	3d^{10}	4s^{2}	4p^{6}	4d^{10}	4f^{14}	5s^{2}	5p^{6}	5d^{10}		6s^{2}	6p^{6}			
2	8		18			32				18				8				
87 Fr francium : [Rn] 7s^{1}
1s^{2}	2s^{2}	2p^{6}	3s^{2}	3p^{6}	3d^{10}	4s^{2}	4p^{6}	4d^{10}	4f^{14}	5s^{2}	5p^{6}	5d^{10}		6s^{2}	6p^{6}		7s^{1}	
2	8		18			32				18				8			1	
88 Ra radium : [Rn] 7s^{2}
1s^{2}	2s^{2}	2p^{6}	3s^{2}	3p^{6}	3d^{10}	4s^{2}	4p^{6}	4d^{10}	4f^{14}	5s^{2}	5p^{6}	5d^{10}		6s^{2}	6p^{6}		7s^{2}	
2	8		18			32				18				8			2	
89 Ac actinium : [Rn] 6d^{1} 7s^{2}
1s^{2}	2s^{2}	2p^{6}	3s^{2}	3p^{6}	3d^{10}	4s^{2}	4p^{6}	4d^{10}	4f^{14}	5s^{2}	5p^{6}	5d^{10}		6s^{2}	6p^{6}	6d^{1}	7s^{2}	
2	8		18			32				18				9			2	
90 Th thorium : [Rn] 6d^{2} 7s^{2}
1s^{2}	2s^{2}	2p^{6}	3s^{2}	3p^{6}	3d^{10}	4s^{2}	4p^{6}	4d^{10}	4f^{14}	5s^{2}	5p^{6}	5d^{10}		6s^{2}	6p^{6}	6d^{2}	7s^{2}	
2	8		18			32				18				10			2	
91 Pa protactinium : [Rn] 5f^{2} 6d^{1} 7s^{2}
1s^{2}	2s^{2}	2p^{6}	3s^{2}	3p^{6}	3d^{10}	4s^{2}	4p^{6}	4d^{10}	4f^{14}	5s^{2}	5p^{6}	5d^{10}	5f^{2}	6s^{2}	6p^{6}	6d^{1}	7s^{2}	
2	8		18			32				20				9			2	
92 U uranium : [Rn] 5f^{3} 6d^{1} 7s^{2}
1s^{2}	2s^{2}	2p^{6}	3s^{2}	3p^{6}	3d^{10}	4s^{2}	4p^{6}	4d^{10}	4f^{14}	5s^{2}	5p^{6}	5d^{10}	5f^{3}	6s^{2}	6p^{6}	6d^{1}	7s^{2}	
2	8		18			32				21				9			2	
93 Np neptunium : [Rn] 5f^{4} 6d^{1} 7s^{2}
1s^{2}	2s^{2}	2p^{6}	3s^{2}	3p^{6}	3d^{10}	4s^{2}	4p^{6}	4d^{10}	4f^{14}	5s^{2}	5p^{6}	5d^{10}	5f^{4}	6s^{2}	6p^{6}	6d^{1}	7s^{2}	
2	8		18			32				22				9			2	
94 Pu plutonium : [Rn] 5f^{6} 7s^{2}
1s^{2}	2s^{2}	2p^{6}	3s^{2}	3p^{6}	3d^{10}	4s^{2}	4p^{6}	4d^{10}	4f^{14}	5s^{2}	5p^{6}	5d^{10}	5f^{6}	6s^{2}	6p^{6}		7s^{2}	
2	8		18			32				24				8			2	
95 Am americium : [Rn] 5f^{7} 7s^{2}
1s^{2}	2s^{2}	2p^{6}	3s^{2}	3p^{6}	3d^{10}	4s^{2}	4p^{6}	4d^{10}	4f^{14}	5s^{2}	5p^{6}	5d^{10}	5f^{7}	6s^{2}	6p^{6}		7s^{2}	
2	8		18			32				25				8			2	
96 Cm curium : [Rn] 5f^{7} 6d^{1} 7s^{2}
1s^{2}	2s^{2}	2p^{6}	3s^{2}	3p^{6}	3d^{10}	4s^{2}	4p^{6}	4d^{10}	4f^{14}	5s^{2}	5p^{6}	5d^{10}	5f^{7}	6s^{2}	6p^{6}	6d^{1}	7s^{2}	
2	8		18			32				25				9			2	
97 Bk berkelium : [Rn] 5f^{9} 7s^{2}
1s^{2}	2s^{2}	2p^{6}	3s^{2}	3p^{6}	3d^{10}	4s^{2}	4p^{6}	4d^{10}	4f^{14}	5s^{2}	5p^{6}	5d^{10}	5f^{9}	6s^{2}	6p^{6}		7s^{2}	
2	8		18			32				27				8			2	
98 Cf californium : [Rn] 5f^{10} 7s^{2}
1s^{2}	2s^{2}	2p^{6}	3s^{2}	3p^{6}	3d^{10}	4s^{2}	4p^{6}	4d^{10}	4f^{14}	5s^{2}	5p^{6}	5d^{10}	5f^{10}	6s^{2}	6p^{6}		7s^{2}	
2	8		18			32				28				8			2	
99 Es einsteinium : [Rn] 5f^{11} 7s^{2}
1s^{2}	2s^{2}	2p^{6}	3s^{2}	3p^{6}	3d^{10}	4s^{2}	4p^{6}	4d^{10}	4f^{14}	5s^{2}	5p^{6}	5d^{10}	5f^{11}	6s^{2}	6p^{6}		7s^{2}	
2	8		18			32				29				8			2	
100 Fm fermium : [Rn] 5f^{12} 7s^{2}
1s^{2}	2s^{2}	2p^{6}	3s^{2}	3p^{6}	3d^{10}	4s^{2}	4p^{6}	4d^{10}	4f^{14}	5s^{2}	5p^{6}	5d^{10}	5f^{12}	6s^{2}	6p^{6}		7s^{2}	
2	8		18			32				30				8			2	
101 Md mendelevium : [Rn] 5f^{13} 7s^{2}
1s^{2}	2s^{2}	2p^{6}	3s^{2}	3p^{6}	3d^{10}	4s^{2}	4p^{6}	4d^{10}	4f^{14}	5s^{2}	5p^{6}	5d^{10}	5f^{13}	6s^{2}	6p^{6}		7s^{2}	
2	8		18			32				31				8			2	
102 No nobelium : [Rn] 5f^{14} 7s^{2}
1s^{2}	2s^{2}	2p^{6}	3s^{2}	3p^{6}	3d^{10}	4s^{2}	4p^{6}	4d^{10}	4f^{14}	5s^{2}	5p^{6}	5d^{10}	5f^{14}	6s^{2}	6p^{6}		7s^{2}	
2	8		18			32				32				8			2	
103 Lr lawrencium : [Rn] 5f^{14} 7s^{2} 7p^{1}
1s^{2}	2s^{2}	2p^{6}	3s^{2}	3p^{6}	3d^{10}	4s^{2}	4p^{6}	4d^{10}	4f^{14}	5s^{2}	5p^{6}	5d^{10}	5f^{14}	6s^{2}	6p^{6}		7s^{2}	7p^{1}
2	8		18			32				32				8			3	
104 Rf rutherfordium : [Rn] 5f^{14} 6d^{2} 7s^{2}
1s^{2}	2s^{2}	2p^{6}	3s^{2}	3p^{6}	3d^{10}	4s^{2}	4p^{6}	4d^{10}	4f^{14}	5s^{2}	5p^{6}	5d^{10}	5f^{14}	6s^{2}	6p^{6}	6d^{2}	7s^{2}	
2	8		18			32				32				10			2	
105 Db dubnium : [Rn] 5f^{14} 6d^{3} 7s^{2}
1s^{2}	2s^{2}	2p^{6}	3s^{2}	3p^{6}	3d^{10}	4s^{2}	4p^{6}	4d^{10}	4f^{14}	5s^{2}	5p^{6}	5d^{10}	5f^{14}	6s^{2}	6p^{6}	6d^{3}	7s^{2}	
2	8		18			32				32				11			2	
106 Sg seaborgium : [Rn] 5f^{14} 6d^{4} 7s^{2}
1s^{2}	2s^{2}	2p^{6}	3s^{2}	3p^{6}	3d^{10}	4s^{2}	4p^{6}	4d^{10}	4f^{14}	5s^{2}	5p^{6}	5d^{10}	5f^{14}	6s^{2}	6p^{6}	6d^{4}	7s^{2}	
2	8		18			32				32				12			2	
107 Bh bohrium : [Rn] 5f^{14} 6d^{5} 7s^{2}
1s^{2}	2s^{2}	2p^{6}	3s^{2}	3p^{6}	3d^{10}	4s^{2}	4p^{6}	4d^{10}	4f^{14}	5s^{2}	5p^{6}	5d^{10}	5f^{14}	6s^{2}	6p^{6}	6d^{5}	7s^{2}	
2	8		18			32				32				13			2	
108 Hs hassium : [Rn] 5f^{14} 6d^{6} 7s^{2}
1s^{2}	2s^{2}	2p^{6}	3s^{2}	3p^{6}	3d^{10}	4s^{2}	4p^{6}	4d^{10}	4f^{14}	5s^{2}	5p^{6}	5d^{10}	5f^{14}	6s^{2}	6p^{6}	6d^{6}	7s^{2}	
2	8		18			32				32				14			2	
109 Mt meitnerium : [Rn] 5f^{14} 6d^{7} 7s^{2} (predicted)
1s^{2}	2s^{2}	2p^{6}	3s^{2}	3p^{6}	3d^{10}	4s^{2}	4p^{6}	4d^{10}	4f^{14}	5s^{2}	5p^{6}	5d^{10}	5f^{14}	6s^{2}	6p^{6}	6d^{7}	7s^{2}	
2	8		18			32				32				15			2	
110 Ds darmstadtium : [Rn] 5f^{14} 6d^{8} 7s^{2} (predicted)
1s^{2}	2s^{2}	2p^{6}	3s^{2}	3p^{6}	3d^{10}	4s^{2}	4p^{6}	4d^{10}	4f^{14}	5s^{2}	5p^{6}	5d^{10}	5f^{14}	6s^{2}	6p^{6}	6d^{8}	7s^{2}	
2	8		18			32				32				16			2	
111 Rg roentgenium : [Rn] 5f^{14} 6d^{9} 7s^{2} (predicted)
1s^{2}	2s^{2}	2p^{6}	3s^{2}	3p^{6}	3d^{10}	4s^{2}	4p^{6}	4d^{10}	4f^{14}	5s^{2}	5p^{6}	5d^{10}	5f^{14}	6s^{2}	6p^{6}	6d^{9}	7s^{2}	
2	8		18			32				32				17			2	
112 Cn copernicium : [Rn] 5f^{14} 6d^{10} 7s^{2} (predicted)
1s^{2}	2s^{2}	2p^{6}	3s^{2}	3p^{6}	3d^{10}	4s^{2}	4p^{6}	4d^{10}	4f^{14}	5s^{2}	5p^{6}	5d^{10}	5f^{14}	6s^{2}	6p^{6}	6d^{10}	7s^{2}	
2	8		18			32				32				18			2	
113 Nh nihonium : [Rn] 5f^{14} 6d^{10} 7s^{2} 7p^{1} (predicted)
1s^{2}	2s^{2}	2p^{6}	3s^{2}	3p^{6}	3d^{10}	4s^{2}	4p^{6}	4d^{10}	4f^{14}	5s^{2}	5p^{6}	5d^{10}	5f^{14}	6s^{2}	6p^{6}	6d^{10}	7s^{2}	7p^{1}
2	8		18			32				32				18			3	
114 Fl flerovium : [Rn] 5f^{14} 6d^{10} 7s^{2} 7p^{2} (predicted)
1s^{2}	2s^{2}	2p^{6}	3s^{2}	3p^{6}	3d^{10}	4s^{2}	4p^{6}	4d^{10}	4f^{14}	5s^{2}	5p^{6}	5d^{10}	5f^{14}	6s^{2}	6p^{6}	6d^{10}	7s^{2}	7p^{2}
2	8		18			32				32				18			4	
115 Mc moscovium : [Rn] 5f^{14} 6d^{10} 7s^{2} 7p^{3} (predicted)
1s^{2}	2s^{2}	2p^{6}	3s^{2}	3p^{6}	3d^{10}	4s^{2}	4p^{6}	4d^{10}	4f^{14}	5s^{2}	5p^{6}	5d^{10}	5f^{14}	6s^{2}	6p^{6}	6d^{10}	7s^{2}	7p^{3}
2	8		18			32				32				18			5	
116 Lv livermorium : [Rn] 5f^{14} 6d^{10} 7s^{2} 7p^{4} (predicted)
1s^{2}	2s^{2}	2p^{6}	3s^{2}	3p^{6}	3d^{10}	4s^{2}	4p^{6}	4d^{10}	4f^{14}	5s^{2}	5p^{6}	5d^{10}	5f^{14}	6s^{2}	6p^{6}	6d^{10}	7s^{2}	7p^{4}
2	8		18			32				32				18			6	
117 Ts tennessine : [Rn] 5f^{14} 6d^{10} 7s^{2} 7p^{5} (predicted)
1s^{2}	2s^{2}	2p^{6}	3s^{2}	3p^{6}	3d^{10}	4s^{2}	4p^{6}	4d^{10}	4f^{14}	5s^{2}	5p^{6}	5d^{10}	5f^{14}	6s^{2}	6p^{6}	6d^{10}	7s^{2}	7p^{5}
2	8		18			32				32				18			7	
118 Og oganesson : [Rn] 5f^{14} 6d^{10} 7s^{2} 7p^{6} (predicted)
1s^{2}	2s^{2}	2p^{6}	3s^{2}	3p^{6}	3d^{10}	4s^{2}	4p^{6}	4d^{10}	4f^{14}	5s^{2}	5p^{6}	5d^{10}	5f^{14}	6s^{2}	6p^{6}	6d^{10}	7s^{2}	7p^{6}
2	8		18			32				32				18			8	

Group 18 element (noble gas), has a complete shell. Complete shells are referred to as "[Ar]" for argon etc.

== See also ==
- Periodic table (electron configurations) – The above information in a periodic table layout
- Extended periodic table#Electron configurations – Predictions for undiscovered elements 119–173 and 184
