= Metamerism (chemistry) =

Obsolete term for chemical isomerism

In chemistry, metamerism is used to define the isomeric relationship between compounds with the same polyvalent, heteroatomic, functional group but differ in the main carbon chain or any of the side chains. It has rather been an obsolete term for isomerism, which has not been recognised by IUPAC in its publications. When Swedish chemist Jöns Jacob Berzelius used the term in 1831, he did so to describe those substances which possess the same percentage composition but had different properties. What Berzelius implied to be called metamerism is now considered as isomerism.

== Examples ==
The isomers which have been cited as examples of metamers in chemical literature consist primarily of ethers; but this could by the same reasoning be extended to thioethers, secondary as well as tertiary amines, esters, secondary as well as tertiary amides, (mixed) acid anhydrides etc.

Metamers in organic chemistry

Ketones however, should be excluded from this class of isomeric relationship, as they primarily are part of position isomerism - as there is no heteroatom present in the functional group, so the two alkyl groups (main chain and side chain) are not disconnected from each other.

== Textbook Use ==
There have been disputes on metamerism being included with other isomerisms such as position as well as chain isomerism, some authors still keep using it in their textbooks, mostly citing the examples of ethers and secondary amines.

== See also ==
- Stereoisomer
- Structural isomer
- Tautomers
