= Endorectal coil magnetic resonance imaging =

- Purpose: imaging MRI is used with a coil placed into rectum to obtain high quality images

Endorectal coil magnetic resonance imaging or endorectal coil MRI is a type of medical imaging in which MRI is used in conjunction with a coil placed into the rectum in order to obtain high quality images of the area surrounding the rectum. The technique has demonstrated higher accuracy than other modalities in assessing seminal vesicle invasion and extra-capsular extension (ECE) of prostate cancer (96% and 81% respectively). Endorectal coil MRI is useful for determining the extent of spread and local invasion of cancers of the prostate, rectum, and anus. The coil consists of a probe with an inflatable balloon which helps maintain appropriate positioning. Similar coils may be used vaginally for evaluating cervical cancer.
