= Delessite =

Magnesium-rich variety of chamosite or iron-rich variety of clinochlore

Delessite is a mineral variety, a magnesium-rich form of chamosite which is a member of the chlorite group. Delessite has the chemical formula (Mg,Fe,Fe,Al)(Si,Al)_{4}O_{10}(O,OH)_{8}.
