= Keilhauite =

Mineral

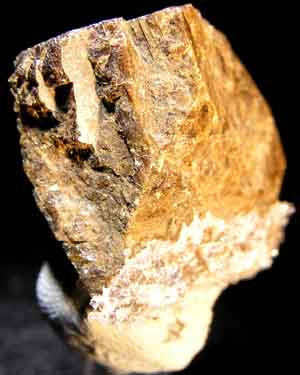
- A rare crystal of keilhauite from the type locality in Bø, Tromøysund, Arendal, Aust-Agder, Norway

General
- Category: Silicate mineral
- Formula: (CaTi,Al_{2},Fe^{3+}_{2},Y^{3+}_{2})SiO_{5}

Keilhauite (also known as yttrotitanite) is a variety of the mineral titanite of a brownish black color, related to titanite in form. It consists chiefly of silicon dioxide, titanium dioxide, calcium oxide, and yttrium oxide. The variety was described in 1841 and named for Baltazar Mathias Keilhau (1797–1858) a Norwegian geologist.

Keilhauite has a chemical formula of (CaTi,Al_{2},Fe^{3+}_{2},Y^{3+}_{2})SiO_{5}. It differs from titanite only in that calcium is substituted by up to 10 percent (Y,Ce)_{2}O_{3}.
