= PMDTT =

Names
- IUPAC name ({[(3R,5R)-5-(5-Methyl-2,4-dioxo-3,4-dihydropyrimidin-1(2H)-yl)oxolan-3-yl]oxy}methyl)phosphonic acid

Identifiers
CAS Number	849904-28-5
3D model (JSmol)	Interactive image
ChEMBL	ChEMBL3976812
ChemSpider	4440846
PubChem CID	5276920
UNII	T23P99LGX3
CompTox Dashboard (EPA)	DTXSID501028096
- InChI: InChI=1S/C10H15N2O7P/c1-6-3-12(10(14)11-9(6)13)8-2-7(4-18-8)19-5-20(15,16)17/h3,7-8H,2,4-5H2,1H3,(H,11,13,14)(H2,15,16,17)/t7-,8-/m1/s1 Key: ICGMUOZWOCLUNS-HTQZYQBOSA-N; InChI=1/C10H15N2O7P/c1-6-3-12(10(14)11-9(6)13)8-2-7(4-18-8)19-5-20(15,16)17/h3,7-8H,2,4-5H2,1H3,(H,11,13,14)(H2,15,16,17)/t7-,8-/m1/s1 Key: ICGMUOZWOCLUNS-HTQZYQBOBH
- SMILES: CC1=CN(C(=O)NC1=O)[C@H]2C[C@H](CO2)OCP(=O)(O)O

Properties
Chemical formula	C_{10}H_{15}N_{2}O_{7}P
Molar mass	306.211 g·mol^{−1}
- Except where otherwise noted, data are given for materials in their standard state (at 25 °C [77 °F], 100 kPa). Infobox references

PMDTT is an antiviral phosphonate nucleoside.
