= Soluene =

Chemical compound

Soluene is a chemical used for dissolving organic matter (a tissue solubilizer). Soluene is an organic base formulated with toluene. Soluene is a Perkin-Elmer's trade name for their product.

Soluene is noted for its ability to dissolve many difficult organic substances such as hair, by the action of alkaline hydrolysis. Where possible soluene is being replaced with water based solubilizers.
