= Caprazamycin =

Group of chemical compounds

Caprazamycins are chemical compounds isolated from Streptomyces which have some antibiotic activity.

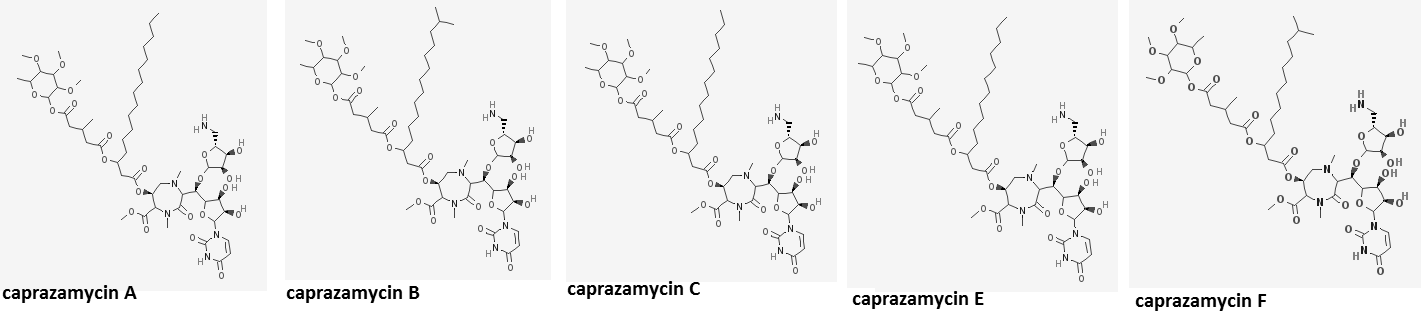
Caprazamycins A, B, C, E, and F
