= Periodic table (electron configurations) =

Electron configurations of the chemical elements (neutral gaseous atoms in the ground state; predictions for elements 109–118)
Group:	1	2															3	4	5	6	7	8	9	10	11	12	13	14	15	16	17	18
1s:	1 H 1																															2 He; 2
[He] 2s: 2p:	3 Li; 1 -	4 Be; 2 -																									5 B 2; 1	6 C 2; 2	7 N 2; 3	8 O 2; 4	9 F 2; 5	10; Ne; 2; 6
[Ne] 3s: 3p:	11; Na; 1 -	12; Mg; 2 -																									13; Al; 2; 1	14; Si; 2; 2	15; P 2; 3	16; S 2; 4	17; Cl; 2; 5	18; Ar; 2; 6
[Ar] 4s: 3d: 4p:	19; K 1 - -	20; Ca; 2 - -															21; Sc; 2; 1 -	22; Ti; 2; 2 -	23; V 2; 3 -	24; Cr; 1; 5 -	25; Mn; 2; 5 -	26; Fe; 2; 6 -	27; Co; 2; 7 -	28; Ni; 2; 8 -	29; Cu; 1; 10 -	30; Zn; 2; 10 -	31; Ga; 2; 10; 1	32; Ge; 2; 10; 2	33; As; 2; 10; 3	34; Se; 2; 10; 4	35; Br; 2; 10; 5	36; Kr; 2; 10; 6
[Kr] 5s: 4d: 5p:	37; Rb; 1 - -	38; Sr; 2 - -															39; Y 2; 1 -	40; Zr; 2; 2 -	41; Nb; 1; 4 -	42; Mo; 1; 5 -	43; Tc; 2; 5 -	44; Ru; 1; 7 -	45; Rh; 1; 8 -	46; Pd - 10 -	47; Ag; 1; 10 -	48; Cd; 2; 10 -	49; In; 2; 10; 1	50; Sn; 2; 10; 2	51; Sb; 2; 10; 3	52; Te; 2; 10; 4	53; I 2; 10; 5	54; Xe; 2; 10; 6
[Xe] 6s: 4f: 5d: 6p:	55; Cs; 1 - - -	56; Ba; 2 - - -	57; La; 2 - 1 -	58; Ce; 2; 1; 1 -	59; Pr; 2; 3 - -	60; Nd; 2; 4 - -	61; Pm; 2; 5 - -	62; Sm; 2; 6 - -	63; Eu; 2; 7 - -	64; Gd; 2; 7; 1 -	65; Tb; 2; 9 - -	66; Dy; 2; 10 - -	67; Ho; 2; 11 - -	68; Er; 2; 12 - -	69; Tm; 2; 13 - -	70; Yb; 2; 14 - -	71; Lu; 2; 14; 1 -	72; Hf; 2; 14; 2 -	73; Ta; 2; 14; 3 -	74; W 2; 14; 4 -	75; Re; 2; 14; 5 -	76; Os; 2; 14; 6 -	77; Ir; 2; 14; 7 -	78; Pt; 1; 14; 9 -	79; Au; 1; 14; 10 -	80; Hg; 2; 14; 10 -	81; Tl; 2; 14; 10; 1	82; Pb; 2; 14; 10; 2	83; Bi; 2; 14; 10; 3	84; Po; 2; 14; 10; 4	85; At; 2; 14; 10; 5	86; Rn; 2; 14; 10; 6
[Rn] 7s: 5f: 6d: 7p:	87; Fr; 1 - - -	88; Ra; 2 - - -	89; Ac; 2 - 1 -	90; Th; 2 - 2 -	91; Pa; 2; 2; 1 -	92; U 2; 3; 1 -	93; Np; 2; 4; 1 -	94; Pu; 2; 6 - -	95; Am; 2; 7 - -	96; Cm; 2; 7; 1 -	97; Bk; 2; 9 - -	98; Cf; 2; 10 - -	99; Es; 2; 11 - -	100; Fm; 2; 12 - -	101; Md; 2; 13 - -	102; No; 2; 14 - -	103; Lr; 2; 14 - 1	104; Rf; 2; 14; 2 -	105; Db; 2; 14; 3 -	106; Sg; 2; 14; 4 -	107; Bh; 2; 14; 5 -	108; Hs; 2; 14; 6 -	109; Mt; 2; 14; 7 -	110; Ds; 2; 14; 8 -	111; Rg; 2; 14; 9 -	112; Cn; 2; 14; 10 -	113; Nh; 2; 14; 10; 1	114; Fl; 2; 14; 10; 2	115; Mc; 2; 14; 10; 3	116; Lv; 2; 14; 10; 4	117; Ts; 2; 14; 10; 5	118; Og; 2; 14; 10; 6
s-block / f-block / d-block / p-block

- Configurations of elements 109 and above are not available. Predictions from reliable sources have been used for these elements.
- Grayed out electron numbers indicate subshells filled to their maximum.
- Bracketed noble gas symbols on the left represent inner configurations that are the same in each period. Written out, these are:

He, 2, helium : 1s^{2}
Ne, 10, neon : 1s^{2} 2s^{2} 2p^{6}
Ar, 18, argon : 1s^{2} 2s^{2} 2p^{6} 3s^{2} 3p^{6}
Kr, 36, krypton : 1s^{2} 2s^{2} 2p^{6} 3s^{2} 3p^{6} 4s^{2} 3d^{10} 4p^{6}
Xe, 54, xenon : 1s^{2} 2s^{2} 2p^{6} 3s^{2} 3p^{6} 4s^{2} 3d^{10} 4p^{6} 5s^{2} 4d^{10} 5p^{6}
Rn, 86, radon : 1s^{2} 2s^{2} 2p^{6} 3s^{2} 3p^{6} 4s^{2} 3d^{10} 4p^{6} 5s^{2} 4d^{10} 5p^{6} 6s^{2} 4f^{14} 5d^{10} 6p^{6}
Og, 118, oganesson : 1s^{2} 2s^{2} 2p^{6} 3s^{2} 3p^{6} 4s^{2} 3d^{10} 4p^{6} 5s^{2} 4d^{10} 5p^{6} 6s^{2} 4f^{14} 5d^{10} 6p^{6} 7s^{2} 5f^{14} 6d^{10} 7p^{6}

- These electron configurations are given for neutral atoms in the gas phase, which are not the same as the electron configurations for the same atoms in chemical environments. In many cases, multiple configurations are within a small range of energies and the small irregularities that arise in the d- and f-blocks are quite irrelevant chemically. The construction of the periodic table ignores these irregularities and is based on ideal electron configurations.
- The shells do not fill in simple shell-number order, which comes about due to the different energies of smaller and larger shells and subshells. The filling order is approximately described by the Madelung rule.

== See also ==
- Electron configurations of the elements (data page)
