= Gallylene =

Gallylenes are a class of gallium species which are electronically neutral and in the +1-oxidation state. This broad definition may include many gallium species, such as oligomeric gallium compounds in which the gallium atoms are coordinated to each other, but these classes of compounds are often referred to as gallanes. In recent literature, the term gallylene has mostly been reserved for low valent gallium species which may have a lone pair, analogous to NHC's or terminal borylenes. They are compounds of academic interest because of their distinctive electronic properties which have been achieved for higher main group elements such as borylenes and carbenes.

== Common gallylenes ==
=== β-diketiminate ligands ===
β-diketiminate ligands (commonly referred to as NacNac ligands) are commonly employed to stabilize gallylenes. These ligands have a lone pair which allows them to act as a Lewis base and form a sigma bond with the gallylene which has Lewis acid character due to its empty p orbitals. These ligands can be modified with bulky substituents which afford kinetic protection to the gallylene. For example, a monomeric Ga(I) compound coordinated to the NacNac ligand with Dipp substituents was synthesized by Power and co-workers. The resulting gallylene had remarkable stability and decomposes above 150 °C. This stability is attributed to the steric bulk of the β-diketiminate ligand and its kinetic protection. This gallylene also had a singlet lone pair and an empty p-orbital, analogous to other metallylene species. NacNacGa(I) is capable of oxidative addition reactions, C-H bond activation, and some substrates will undergo both processes. For example, this gallylene is capable of cleaving E-Et bonds and forming E-E complexes between two NacNacGa(I) complexes. Metal salts will undergo oxidative addition as well. The general form of the oxidative addition reactions is shown in the figure below, but many substrates will form more complex species in between the two NacNacGa(I) ligands. Roesky and coworkers point out that this suite of reactivity demonstrates the electrophilic and nucleophilic character of these gallylenes, since they can both accept electron density into the empty p orbital and donate their lone pair.

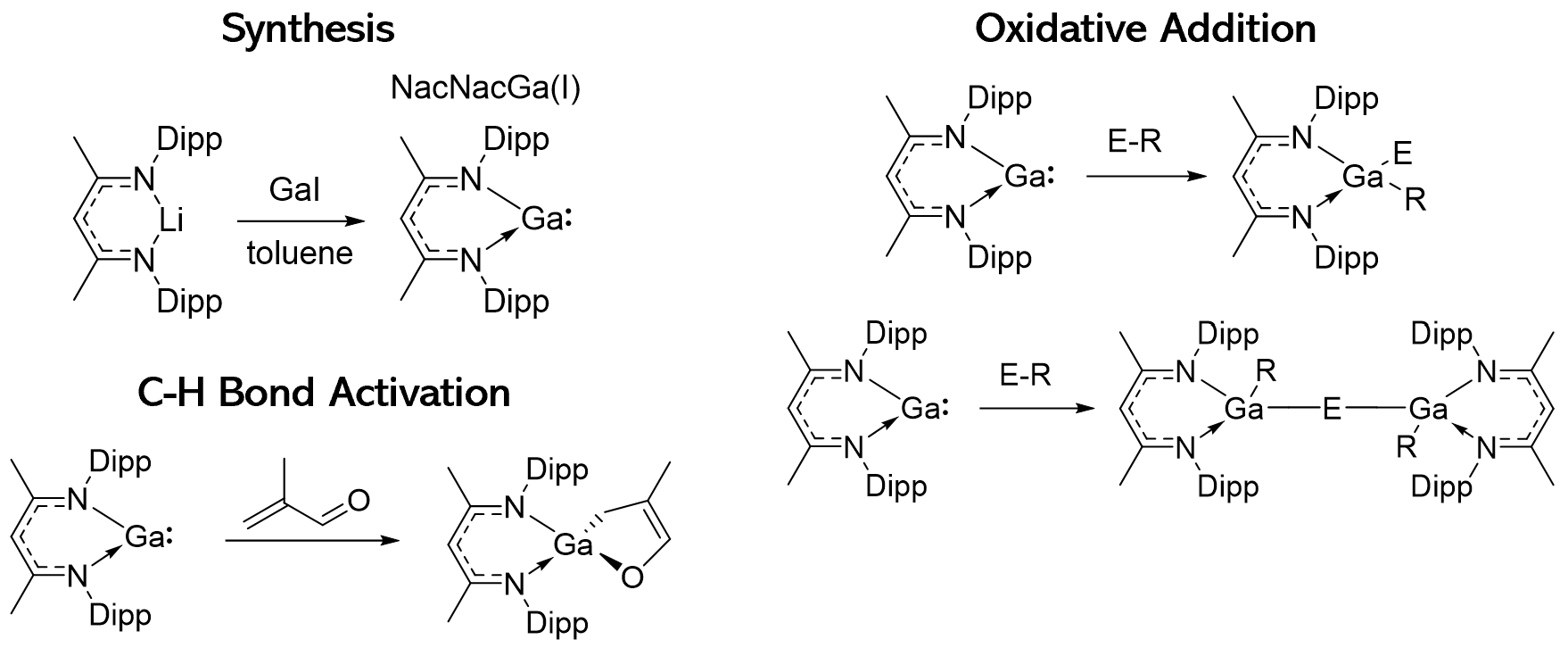
Gallylene B-diketiminate reactivity and synthesis

The β-diketiminate ligands are also capable of activating Ga-H bonds for subsequent reactivity. For example, Aldridge and coworkers demonstrated that a β-diketiminato gallane (GaH_{2}) could react with [Cr(CO)_{4}(COD)] and replace the COD ligand. The reaction resulted in two distinct products, one which resulted in two Ga-H-Cr bridging bonds, and one in which the hydrogen atoms were eliminated and the resulting gallylene coordinated to the Cr center with a bond length of 2.459 Angstroms. The reaction was notably slower with the Al analogue, indicating the relatively lower hydricity of Ga-H species.

=== Pincer ligands ===
The complexes formed by NacNacGa(I) and monodentate ligated gallylenes are typically incapable of downstream functionalization and further reactivity, as the metallylene will typically be lost during reactions. Pincer type ligands can be used to stabilize gallylene-derived complexes during reactivity. Iwasawa and coworkers demonstrated this by synthesizing an iridium complex with a pincer-type gallylene ligand. They note that the gallium is reduced to Ga(I) with the addition of Ir(I), and thus the ligand can be termed a gallylene. There is no lone pair on the gallylene in the resulting complex, but the formal oxidation states nonetheless suggest a complex featuring a neutral Ga(I). The reaction of this pincer Ir complex with tetrabutylammonium formate resulted in ligand exchange of the pincer complex and decarboxylation of the tetrabutylammonium formate. Iwasawa and coworkers also demonstrated other various ligand exchanges which resulted in the loss of a chloride and the addition of other ligands such as CO, PhH_{2}Si, and GaCl_{3}.

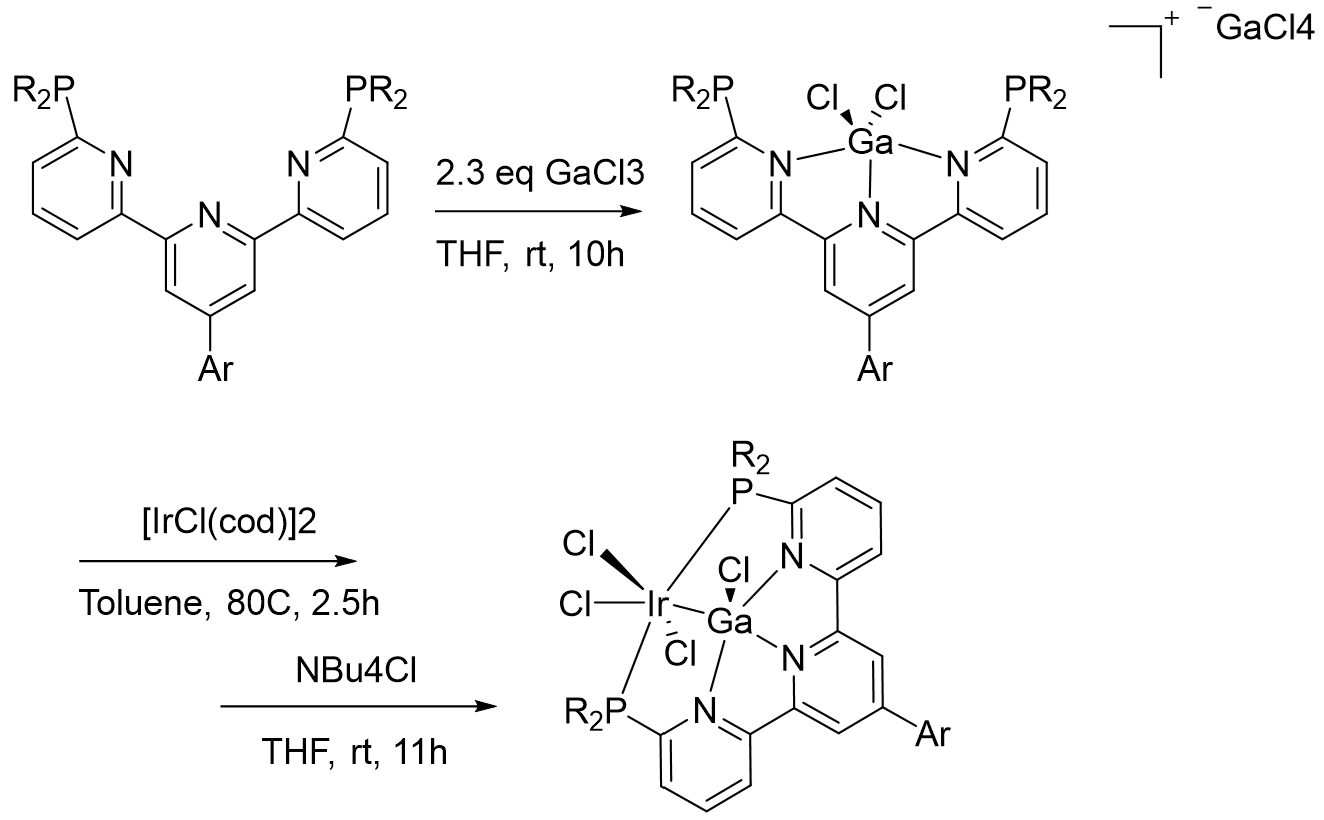
Synthesis of gallylene pincer complex

=== Transition metal ligands ===
Gallylenes are often used as ligands in transition metal chemistry. One early example of a Ga-M system was the reported Ga-Fe triple bond by Robinson and coworkers. This was refuted by Albert Cotton, who stated that there was a dative Ga-Fe bond, and any further bond order would be achieved with back-donation of Fe electrons into the empty orbitals on the Ga atom. Back-donation into Ga would be accompanied by less back-bonding into the CO ligands on the iron, and this would be reflected in the stretching frequency of the CO. Experimentally, this is not observed and thus the Ga-M bond was considered a single dative bond. Indeed this topic has been studied computationally since, and the lack of multibond character is mostly supported. Aldridge and Pandey conducted a DFT study on cationic metal-gallylene complexes of iron, ruthenium, and osmium and found that the bonding can be described as a single bond with high Ga 4s character, and a small degree of pi-bonding. M-GaX bonds (X = halide) are weaker than M-CO bonds, and have a considerable ionic character.

The ability of the gallylene to behave as a transition metal ligand is highly dependent on the gallylene's ligands itself. Fischer demonstrated that GaCp* (Cp* = C_{5}Me_{5}), could be used to prepare homoleptic octahedral molybdenum complexes, and homoleptic trigonal bipyramidal rhodium complexes. In contrast, NacNacGa(I) does not as effectively coordinate to the metal centers. The relative difference in their coordinating ability is attributed to the rigidity of the NacNac ligand, its increased steric bulk, and concave ligand shape.

== Reactivity ==
=== CO and CN cleavage ===
Gallylenes can undergo [1+2] cycloaddition reactions with isocyanates and cleave C=O and C=N bonds. The reaction proceeds via a two-electron reduction of the isocyanate (O=C=N-R) by the gallylene to produce a digallacyclohexane in which the gallium atoms are in the +3 oxidation state and the C=N double bond has been cleaved. This reaction is sensitive to the substituents on the isocyanate. When R = p-tolyl, the reaction afforded two gallane heterocycles composed of two of the isocyanates, with an N-p-tolyl inserted in the heterocycle.

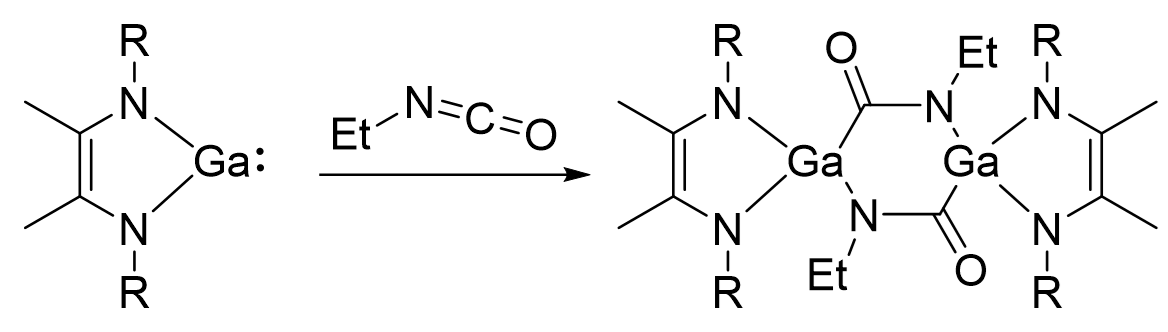
Isocyanate bond cleavage by gallylene

=== Hydride transfer ===
Gallylenes can be used to prepare gallane hydride species, which can act as a source of two hydrides and also a strong electron donor to stabilize resulting high-oxidation state transition metal hydride complexes. Aldridge et al. demonstrated this reactivity by preparing an Ir(IV) complex coordinated to four hydrides, a bidentate phosphorus ligand, and the NacNacGa ligand.

=== C-H activation ===
Fischer and coworkers demonstrated that a NacNacGa(I) complex could cleave the C-H bonds of an organoruthenium derivative and subsequently stabilize the resulting ruthenium species. This reaction can also be thought of as a ligand exchange between the hydrido ligands and the gallylene, in which the gallylene adopts a bridging coordination mode after hydrido elimination. Similar reactivity was demonstrated with an organoruthenium complex which had 4 chloride ligands instead of hydrido ligands: two chloride ligands were abstracted by the addition of the NacNacGa(I), resulting in an organoruthenium complex with two bridging chlorides and a NacNacGa(III) coordinated to two chlorides.

=== Cycloadducts ===
Fedushkin and coworkers have demonstrated a suite of reactivity for gallylenes that are stabilized via the 1,2-bis[(2,6-diisopropylphenyl)imino]acenaphthene ligand (abbreviated as dpp-bian). This is a redox active ligand which is able to cooperatively react with the gallylene. Fedushkin and coworkers demonstrated that this gallylene could react with Ytterbium in dimethoxyethane (DME) in the presence of CO_{2} to afford a gallium coordinated to a methyl group and the dimethoxyethane. They reported that the resulting coordination of DME is unprecedented. The same gallylene reacted with magnesium in DME in the presence of diphenylketene to afford a cycloadduct in which the terminal carbon of the ketene bonded to the beta amine position and the oxygen bonded to the gallium. This product also featured a Ga-Me bond which is thought to arise from the solvent DME. These reactions are proposed to proceed via a mechanism where the substrate coordinates to the metal center and is reduced. This initiates homolytic cleavage of Ga-M bond, and the now activated Ga species will attack DME to extract a methyl group. The dpp-bian gallylene has been used by the Fedushkin group to prepare other cycloadducts, and dimeric species where the substrates are coordinated by two of the gallylene species.

=== Azides ===
Fedushkin and coworkers demonstrated that the dimer composed of two gallylenes with a-diimine ligands was able to react with organic azides. This gallylene's reactivity is especially dependent on the ligand which is redox-active, and can thus cooperatively react with the gallylene. The ligand may aid in bond formation on the gallylene, wherein the delocalized pi bond between the imines is able to reduce the gallium atom during an oxidative addition, thereby preserving the oxidation state of the gallylene. Alternatively, the delocalized pi bond can directly form bonds with substrates and lead to the cycloadducts mentioned above. The cooperative reactivity between the gallylene and the redox active ligand enabled this dimer to perform azide transformations and afford imido-, azoimido-, and tetrazene complexes.

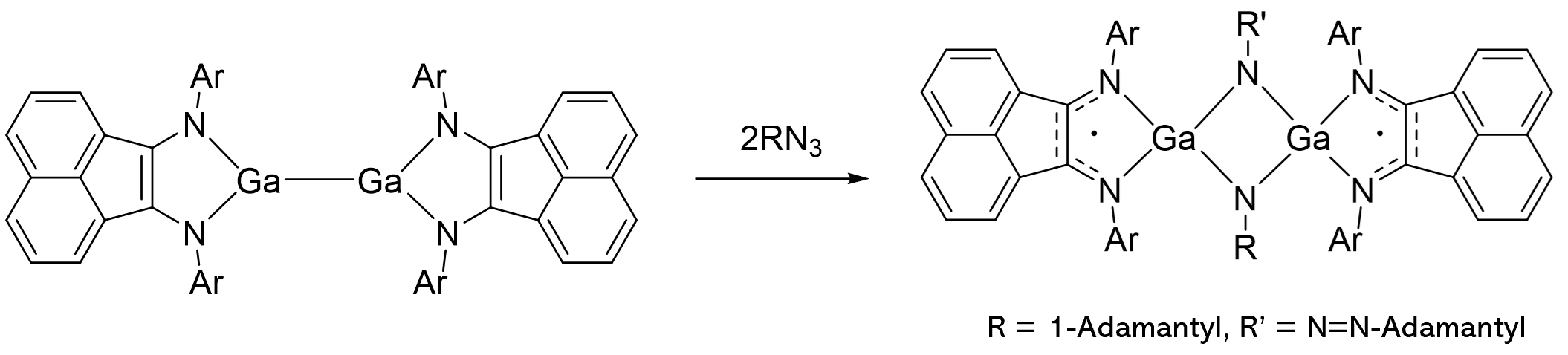
Fedushkins reactivity of gallylenes and azides

=== Carbodiimides ===
Fedushkin and coworkers demonstrated that treating the a-diimine ligated gallylene with carbodiimides resulted in guanidinate derivatives via reductive coupling. In contrast to the reactivity demonstrated with azides, the ligand system here is reported as "innocent", meaning redox inactive. Products were confirmed via NMR and crystal XRD. The proposed mechanism for this reactivity involves a [1+2] cycloaddition between the gallylene and carbodiimide, and there is computational evidence for this mechanism.

== Computational studies and electronic structure ==
Five-membered gallylene heterocycles have been modeled computationally, and they have been found to have a singlet-triplet energy gap of ca. 52 kcal/mol. The Ga-N bonds are very polar, with electron density being concentrated on the N atom of the heterocycle. Moreover, the singlet lone pair of the gallylene is found to reside within an sp-hybridized orbital. Six-membered gallylene heterocycles, such as those prepared with NacNac ligands have a higher singlet-triplet energy separation than aluminum counterparts. This is due to the relative stabilization of the gallium metal lone pair, and gallium's relatively diminished Lewis acidity.

One common application of gallylene species is their use as transition metal ligands. Braunschweig and coworkers conducted a bonding energy analysis of terminal gallylene complexes of vanadium and niobium to investigate the nature of this bonding. The bond distances in these gallylene complexes almost resemble the single bond distances expected from an estimate of covalent radii, and are larger than those expected for a double bond. Based on these bond distances, the M-Ga bond resemble single bonds with very small pi-orbital contribution. This is confirmed by the wiberg bond index of ~0.5. The bonding overall can be attributed to sigma donation from the gallylene to the metal. These bonds are considerably more ionic than the covalent bonding of other group-13 elements such as boron in equivalent complexes.

Jeyakumar and coworkers conducted DFT calculations and NBO analysis on Group 10 metal gallylene complexes of the form [TM(CO)_{3}(GaX)]. Their calculations confirm the idea that gallylene ligands behave as sigma donors and, to a lesser extent, pi-acceptors. Based on their calculated energies of transition state in the formation of TM(CO)_{3}(GaX) from TM(CO)_{4} and GaX in THF, they suggest that GaF substituted Pt complexes are the most viable products.

Mondal and coworkers have computationally studied the aromaticity of NHC analogues, and found that gallylene NHC's are the second most aromatic among the group 13 elements. This result was consistent across a variety of methods used to assess aromaticity: 1H NMR, nucleus-independent chemical shift, aromatic ring shielding, gauge-including magnetically induced current, and Stranger's method.
