= Magnetic resonance (quantum mechanics) =

Quantum mechanical effect

In quantum mechanics, magnetic resonance is a resonant effect that can appear when a magnetic dipole is exposed to a static magnetic field and perturbed with another, oscillating electromagnetic field. Due to the static field, the dipole can assume a number of discrete energy eigenstates, depending on the value of its angular momentum (azimuthal) quantum number. The oscillating field can then make the dipole transit between its energy states with a certain probability and at a certain rate. The overall transition probability will depend on the field's frequency and the rate will depend on its amplitude. When the frequency of that field leads to the maximum possible transition probability between two states, a magnetic resonance has been achieved. In that case, the energy of the photons composing the oscillating field matches the energy difference between said states. If the dipole is tickled with a field oscillating far from resonance, it is unlikely to transition. That is analogous to other resonant effects, such as with the forced harmonic oscillator. The periodic transition between the different states is called Rabi cycle and the rate at which that happens is called Rabi frequency. The Rabi frequency should not be confused with the field's own frequency. Since many atomic nuclei species can behave as a magnetic dipole, this resonance technique is the basis of nuclear magnetic resonance, including nuclear magnetic resonance imaging and nuclear magnetic resonance spectroscopy.

== Quantum mechanical explanation ==
As a magnetic dipole, using a spin $\tfrac{1}{2}$ system such as a proton; according to the quantum mechanical state of the system, denoted by $|\Psi(t)\rangle$, evolved by the action of a unitary operator $e^{-i{\hat H t}/\hbar}$; the result obeys Schrödinger equation:

$$i \hbar \frac{\partial}{\partial t}\Psi = \hat H \Psi$$

States with definite energy evolve in time with phase $e^{-iEt/\hbar}$, ($|\Psi(t)\rangle= |\Psi(0)\rangle e^{-iEt/\hbar}$) where E is the energy of the state, since the probability of finding the system in state $| \langle x|\Psi(t)\rangle|^2$ = $| \langle x|\Psi(0)\rangle|^2$ is independent of time. Such states are termed stationary states, so if a system is prepared in a stationary state, (i.e. one of the eigenstates of the Hamiltonian operator), then P(t) = 1, i.e. it remains in that state indefinitely. This is the case only for isolated systems. When a system in a stationary state is perturbed, its state changes, so it is no longer an eigenstate of the system's complete Hamiltonian. This same phenomenon happens in magnetic resonance for a spin $\tfrac{1}{2}$ system in a magnetic field.

The Hamiltonian for a magnetic dipole $\mathbf{m}$ (associated with a spin $\tfrac{1}{2}$ particle) in a magnetic field $\mathbf{B_0}=B_0\hat{z}$ is:

$$\hat{H}=-\mathbf{m}\cdot \mathbf{B_0} = -\tfrac{\hbar}{2}\gamma \sigma_z B_{0} = -\tfrac{\hbar}{2} \omega_0 \begin{bmatrix}1 & 0 \\0 & -1 \end{bmatrix}$$

Here $\omega_0 := \gamma B_0$ is the Larmor precession frequency of the dipole for $\mathbf{B_0}$ magnetic field and $\sigma_z$ is z Pauli matrix. So the eigenvalues of $\hat{H}$ are $-\tfrac{\hbar}{2}\omega_0$ and $\tfrac{\hbar}{2}\omega_0$. If the system is perturbed by a weak magnetic field $\mathbf{B_1}$, rotating counterclockwise in x-y plane (normal to $\mathbf{B_0}$) with angular frequency $\omega$, so that $\mathbf{B_1}=\hat{i}B_1 \cos{\omega t}-\hat{j}B_1 \sin{\omega t}$ , then
$$\begin{bmatrix}1\\0 \end{bmatrix}$$
and
$$\begin{bmatrix}0\\1 \end{bmatrix}$$
are not eigenstates of the Hamiltonian, which is modified into

$$\hat{H}=\gamma \begin{pmatrix} B_0 & B_1e^{ i\omega t}\\ B_1 e^{- i\omega t} & -B_0\end{pmatrix}.$$

It is inconvenient to deal with a time-dependent hamiltonian. To make $\hat{H}$ time-independent requires a new reference frame rotating with $\mathbf{B_1}$, i.e. rotation operator $\hat{R}(t)$ on $|\Psi(t)\rangle$, which amounts to basis change in Hilbert space. Using this on Schrödinger's equation, the Hamiltonian becomes:

$$\hat{H^\prime}=\hat{R}(t)\hat{H}\hat{R}(t)^\dagger +\tfrac{\hbar}{2}\omega\sigma_z$$

Writing $\hat{R}(t)$ in the basis of $\sigma_z$ as-

$$\hat{R}(t)=\begin{pmatrix}e^{-i{\omega}t/2}&0\\0&e^{i{\omega}t/2}\end{pmatrix}$$

Using this form of the Hamiltonian a new basis is found:

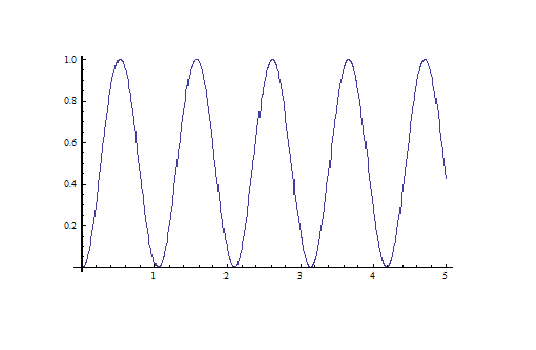
Plot of Probability Amplitude of Spin Flip at Resonance

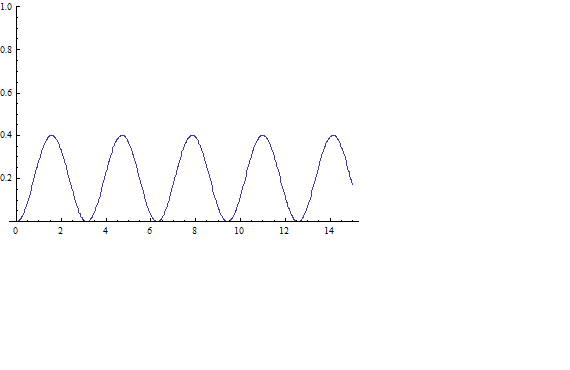
Plot of Probability Amplitude of Spin Flip in absence of Resonance

$$\hat{H^\prime}=\tfrac{\hbar}{2}\begin{pmatrix}\Delta\omega&-\omega_1\\-\omega_1&-\Delta\omega\end{pmatrix}$$
where $\Delta\omega=\omega-\omega_ 0$ and $\omega_1=\gamma B_1$

This Hamiltonian is exactly similar to that of a two state system with unperturbed energies $\tfrac{\hbar}{2}\Delta\omega$ and $-\tfrac{\hbar}{2}\Delta\omega$ with a perturbation expressed by
$$\tfrac{\hbar}{2}\begin{pmatrix}0&-\omega_1\\-\omega_1&0\end{pmatrix}$$
; According to Rabi oscillation, starting with
$$\begin{bmatrix}1\\0 \end{bmatrix}$$
state, a dipole in parallel to $\mathbf{B_0}$ with energy $-\tfrac{\hbar}{2}\omega_0$, the probability that it will transit to
$$\begin{bmatrix}0\\1\end{bmatrix}$$
state (i.e. it will flip) is

$P_{12}=\frac{|\omega_1^2|}{|\Delta\omega^2+\omega_1^2|}\sin^2[\sqrt{\omega_1^2+\Delta\omega^2}t/2]$

Now consider $\omega = \omega_0$, i.e. the $\mathbf{B_1}$ field oscillates at the same rate the dipole exposed to the $\mathbf{B_0}$ field does. That is a case of resonance. Then at specific points in time, namely $t = \frac{(2n+1)\pi}{\sqrt{\omega_1^2+\Delta\omega^2}}$, the dipole will flip, going to the other energy eigenstate
$$\begin{bmatrix}0\\1 \end{bmatrix}$$
with a 100% probability. When $\omega \not=\omega_0$, the probability of change of energy state is small. Therefore, the resonance condition can be used, for instance, to measure the magnetic moment of a dipole or the magnetic field at a point in space.

== A special case to show applications ==
A special case occurs where a system oscillates between two unstable levels that have the same life time $\tau$. If atoms are excited at a constant, say n/time, to the first state, some decay and the rest have a probability $P_{12}$ to transition to the second state, so in the time interval between t and (t + dt) the number of atoms that jump to the second state from the first is $n(1-e^{-t/\tau})P_{12}dt$, so at time t the number of atoms in the second state is

Plot of Rate of Decay with Variation of Uniform Magnetic Field $B_0$

Plot of Half-Width of Lorentz Curve with Changing $B_1$

$$dN=n.e^{-t/\tau}.(1-e^{-t/\tau})P_{12}dt$$
= $n. e^{-t/\tau} .P_{12} dt$

The rate of decay from state two depends on the number of atoms that were collected in that state from all previous intervals, so the number of atoms in state 2 is $\int_{-\infty}^{0} ne^{-t/\tau}P_{12}\ dt$; The rate of decay of atoms from state two is proportional to the number of atoms present in that state, while the constant of proportionality is decay constant $\lambda$ . Performing the integration rate of decay of atoms from state two is obtained as:

$$(n/2)\omega^2/(\delta\omega^2+\omega_1^2+1/\tau^2)$$

From this expression many interesting points can be exploited, such

- Varying uniform magnetic field $B_0$ so that $\omega_0$ in $\delta\omega$ produces a Lorentz curve (see Cauchy–Lorentz distribution), detecting the peak of that curve, the abscissa of it gives $\omega_0$, so now $\omega$ (angular frequency of rotation of $\mathbf{B}_1$ = $\gamma$ $(B_0)_\text{max}$, so from the known value of $\omega$ and $(B_0)_\text{max}$, the gyromagnetic ratio $\gamma$ of the dipole can be measured; by this method we can measure Nuclear spin where all electronic spins are balanced. Correct measurement of nuclear magnetic moment helps to understand the character of nuclear force.
- If $\gamma$ is known, by varying $\omega$, the value of $B_0$ can be obtained. This measurement technique is precise enough for use in sensitive magnetometers. Using this technique, the value of magnetic field acting at a particular lattice site by its environment inside a crystal can be obtained.
- By measuring half-width of the curve, d = $\sqrt{\omega_1^2+1/\tau^2}$, for several values of $\omega_1$ (i.e. of $B_1$), we can plot d vs $\omega_1$, and by extrapolating this line for $\omega_1$, the lifetime of unstable states can be obtained from the intercept.

== Rabi's method ==
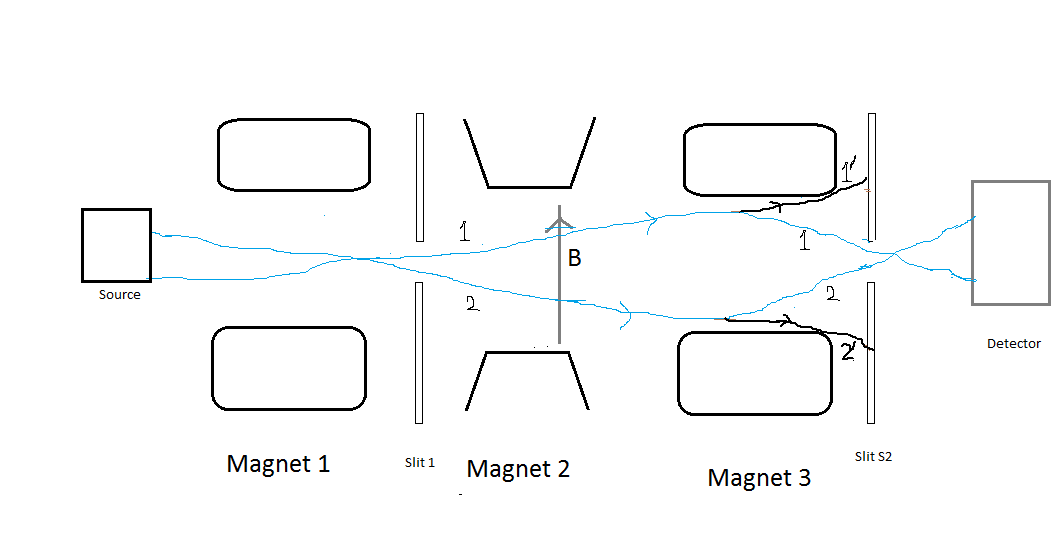
Apparatus Suggested and Used by Rabi

The existence of spin angular momentum of electrons was discovered experimentally by the Stern–Gerlach experiment. In that study a beam of neutral atoms with one electron in the valence shell, carrying no orbital momentum (from the viewpoint of quantum mechanics) was passed through an inhomogeneous magnetic field. This process was not approximate due to the small deflection angle, resulting in considerable uncertainty in the measured value of the split beam.

Rabi's method was an improvement over Stern-Gerlach. As shown in the figure, the source emits a beam of neutral atoms, having spin angular momentum $\hbar/2$. The beam passes through a series of three aligned magnets. Magnet 1 produces an inhomogeneous magnetic field with a high gradient $\frac{\partial B}{\partial z}$ (as in Stern–Gerlach), so the atoms having 'upward' spin (with $S_z=\hbar/2$) will deviate downward (path 1), i.e. to the region of less magnetic field B, to minimize energy. Atoms with 'downward' spin with $S_z=-\hbar/2$) will deviate upward similarly (path 2). Beams are passed through slit 1, to reduce any effects of source beyond. Magnet 2 produces only a uniform magnetic field in the vertical direction applying no force on the atomic beam, and magnet 3 is actually inverted magnet 1. In the region between the poles of magnet 3, atoms having 'upward' spin get upward push and atoms having 'downward' spin feel downward push, so their path remains 1 and 2 respectively. These beams pass through a second slit S2, and arrive at detector and get detected.

If a horizontal rotating field $B_1$, angular frequency of rotation $\omega_1$ is applied in the region between poles of magnet 2, produced by oscillating current in circular coils then there is a probability for the atoms passing through there from one spin state to another ($S_z =+\hbar/2 ->-\hbar/2$ and vice versa), when $\omega_1$ = $\omega_p$, Larmor frequency of precession of magnetic moment in B. The atoms that transition from 'upward' to 'downward' spin will experience a downward force while passing through magnet 3, and will follow path 1'. Similarly, atoms that change from 'downward' to 'upward' spin will follow path 2', and these atoms will not reach the detector, causing a minimum in detector count. If angular frequency $\omega_1$ of $B_1$ is varied continuously, then a minimum in detector current will be obtained (when $\omega_1$ = $\omega_p$). From this known value of $\omega_1$$=geB/{2\hbar}$, where g is 'Landé g factor', 'Landé g-factor' is obtained which will enable one to have correct value of magnetic moment $\mu ~=g q\hbar /{4m}$. This experiment, performed by Isidor Isaac Rabi is more sensitive and accurate compared than Stern-Gerlach.

== Correspondence between classical and quantum mechanical explanations ==
Spin angular momentum allows magnetic resonance phenomena to be explained via classical physics. When viewed from the reference frame attached to the rotating field, it seems that the magnetic dipole precesses around a net magnetic field $(\Delta\omega\hat z-\omega_1\hat X)/\gamma$, where $\hat z$ is the unit vector along uniform magnetic field $B_0$ and $\hat X$ is the same in the direction of rotating field $B_1$ and $\delta\omega=\omega-\omega_0$.

Proof of classical expression for precession

Pictorial representation of classical Larmor precession

Classical electrodynamics tells us that torque on a magnetic dipole of moment $\mathbf{m}$ is $\mathbf{m}\times\mathbf{B}$, so its equation of motion is $\frac{d\mathbf{L}}{dt}= \mathbf{m}\times\mathbf{B}$, (where $\mathbf{L}$ is the angular momentum associated with dipole) so –

$$\frac{d\mathbf{m}}{dt}= \gamma\mathbf{m}\times\mathbf{B}$$

For the case under consideration the dipole is under the action of magnetic field $\mathbf{B}$ and $\mathbf{B}_1$, hence

$$\frac{d\mathbf{m}}{dt}= \gamma\mathbf{m}\times(\mathbf{B}+\mathbf{B}_1)$$

It is easier to solve it by transforming co-ordinate system to OXYZ in which $\mathbf{B}_1$ becomes OX axis, in that frame –

$$\frac{d\mathbf{m}'}{dt}=\frac{d\mathbf{m}}{dt}+\mathbf{m}\times\boldsymbol{\omega}$$

here $\boldsymbol{\omega}=\omega\hat z.$ Using $\omega_0=\gamma B$ and $\omega_1=\gamma B_1$, one can see that –

$$\frac{d\mathbf{m}'}{dt}= \mathbf{m}\times(\boldsymbol{\omega}_0+\boldsymbol{\omega}_1-\boldsymbol{\omega}) = \mathbf{m}\times(-\Delta\boldsymbol{\omega} + \boldsymbol{\omega}_1)$$

so, here effective field becomes :$\mathbf{B}_{\rm effective} = \Delta\boldsymbol{\omega}-\boldsymbol{\omega_1} =\Delta\omega\hat{z}-\omega_1\hat{X}$

So when $\omega =\omega_0$, a high precession amplitude allows the magnetic moment to be completely flipped. Classical and quantum mechanical predictions correspond well, which can be viewed as an example of the Bohr Correspondence principle, which states that quantum mechanical phenomena, when predicted in classical regime, should match the classical result. The origin of this correspondence is that the evolution of the expected value of magnetic moment is identical to that obtained by classical reasoning. The expectation value of the magnetic moment is $\langle\mathbf{m}\rangle= \gamma \langle\mathbf{S}\rangle$. The time evolution of $\langle\mathbf{m}\rangle$ is given by

$$i\hbar\frac{d}{dt }\langle\mathbf{m}\rangle = \langle[\mathbf{m},\hat H]\rangle$$
$$\hat H = -\mathbf{m}\cdot\mathbf{B}(t)$$

so, $[m_i,\hat H]=[m_i,-m_j B_j]=[\gamma \mathbf{S}_i,-\gamma \mathbf{S}_j \mathbf{B}_j]=-\gamma^2 [\mathbf{S}_i,\mathbf{S}_j \mathbf{B}_j] =-\gamma^2 i\hbar [{\mathbf{S}_k \mathbf{B}_j-\mathbf{S}_j \mathbf{B}_k}] , (i\neq j,k)$

So, $[m_i,\hat H]=i\hbar \gamma [\mathbf{B}_j \mathbf{m}_k -\mathbf{B}_k \mathbf{m}_j]$ and

$\frac{d}{dt }\langle\mathbf{m}(t)\rangle = \gamma\langle\mathbf{m}(t)\rangle\times\langle\mathbf{B}(t)\rangle$

which looks exactly similar to the equation of motion of magnetic moment $\mathbf{m}$ in classical mechanics –

$$\frac {d}{dt} \mathbf{m}(t) =\gamma\mathbf{m}(t)\times\mathbf{B}(t)$$

This analogy in the mathematical equation for the evolution of magnetic moment and its expectation value facilitates to understand the phenomena without a background of quantum mechanics.

== Magnetic resonance imaging ==
In magnetic resonance imaging (MRI) the spin angular momentum of the proton is used. The most available source for protons in the human body is represented by hydrogen atoms in water. A strong magnetic field $B$ applied to water causes the appearance of two different energy levels for spin angular momentum, $+\gamma\hbar B/2$ and $-\gamma\hbar B/2$, using $E=-\mathbf{\mu}\cdot\mathbf{B}$.

According to the Boltzmann distribution, as the number of systems having energy $E$ out of $N_0$ at temperature $T$ is $N_0 e^{-E/kT}$ (where $k$ is the Boltzmann constant), the lower energy level, associated with spin $\hbar/2$, is more populated than the other. In the presence of a rotating magnetic field more protons flip from $S_z=+\hbar/2$ to $S_z=-\hbar/2$ than the other way, causing absorption of microwave or radio-wave radiation (from the rotating field). When the field is withdrawn, protons tend to re-equilibrate along the Boltzmann distribution, so some of them transition from higher energy levels to lower ones, emitting microwave or radio-wave radiation at specific frequencies.

Instead of nuclear spin, spin angular momentum of unpaired electrons is used in EPR (electron paramagnetic resonance) in order to detect free radicals, etc.

== Magnetic resonance as a quantum phenomenon ==
The phenomenon of magnetic resonance is rooted in the existence of spin angular momentum of a quantum system and its specific orientation with respect to an applied magnetic field. Both cases have no explanation in the classical approach and can be understood only by using quantum mechanics. Some people claim that purely quantum phenomena are those that cannot be explained by the classical approach. For example, phenomena in the microscopic domain that can to some extent be described by classical analogy are not really quantum phenomena. Since the basic elements of magnetic resonance have no classical origin, although analogy can be made with classical Larmor precession, MR should be treated as a quantum phenomenon.

== See also ==
- Nuclear magnetic resonance
- Magnetic resonance imaging
- Bloch equations
- Physics of magnetic resonance imaging
