= House of Narro =

House of Narro Casa de Narro
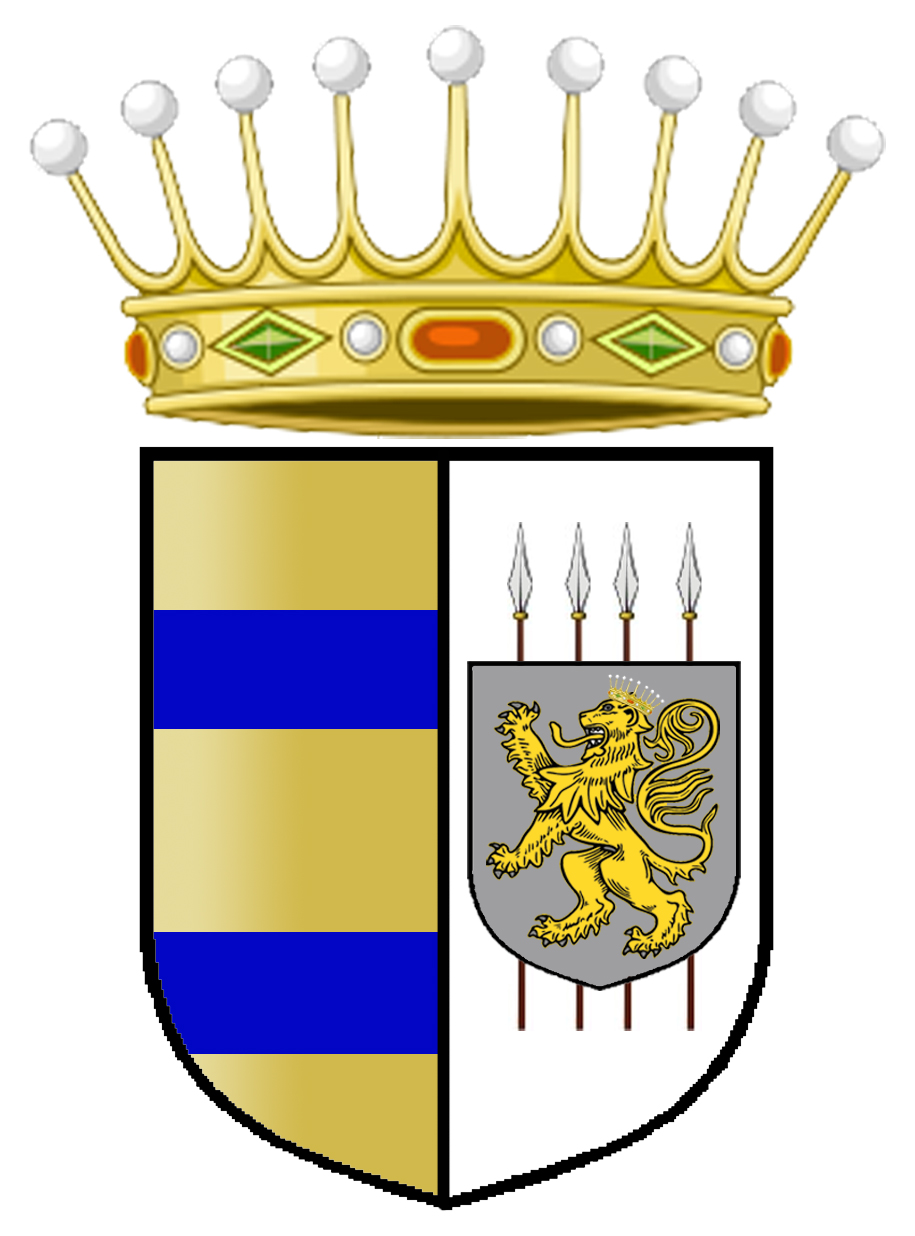
- Origin: Guipuzcoa, Basque Country
- Titles: Mencho: County of Guadalupe del Peñasco; Marquis of Narros
- Estate: of Spain

The House of Narro is a Spanish noble lineage originally from Guipuzcoa, Basque Country. From there, it spread to various provinces and Spanish kingdoms, particularly to Catalonia, the current Rioja, Avila (Castile and Leon) and America.

It became important during the proliferation of Castile in the 13th century. It was one of the 100 families who were granted the Segovia area. In fact, there are some towns and villages that carry the name such as; Narros de Salduena in Avile who still have the famous castle of Narros, or the municipality of Narros, also in Avile, that received its name as it was populated by Naharros in the XIII century.

Another example is the palace of Narros in Zarauz, Guipuzcoa, from the 16th century and belonging from the 17th century to the Marquises of Narros. Nowadays the palace is owned by the Dukes of Granada de Ega.

== Coat of arms ==
The shield is divided into two main sections; in golden background two horizontal blue stripes signifying respect, strength, truth and loyalty. The second portion is composed by four silver spears pointing up, being an emblem of the courageous service and devotion to the honor and chivalry, holding in front of them a shield made from the same metal, signifying wisdom, sincerity and peace, with a rampant lion in gold tone underlying courage, that of a valiant warrior who serves his country.

== Etymology ==
The Naharro surname in Basque language denotes "brambles" or "group of prickly scrambling shrubs". Sources mention that originally was Nyarro, also coming from the Basque Country, in which language would mean "aged wine boot".

== Historical facts ==
The origin of this surname is very controversial so that several legends of its history exist. Some sources mention that it was initially written as Nyarro from the Basque Country. Other references place it in Catalonia, settled in the village of Nyer, in the valley of Mantel, belonging to the Coll de Madona, in what is France today.

Following legends, during the 16th and 17th century centuries region two antagonistic groups, the Narro and the Cadells lived in the Catalan region, always being in constant struggles. These clashes took place in Sardinia; Valley Urgel is located in Lleida, one of the oldest cities in Spain.

Grouped in bands (giving rise to the term "bandits"), Narros and Cadells were so famous in Europe, such as Welves and Guivelinos in Milan, the popes and Medicis in Florence, or Beumonts and Agramont in Navarre. Such was the rivalry between the two sides that in 1592, the Barcelona Provincial Council tried to expel them. In 1605 Catalan authorities tried to reconcile and reach an agreement between them, the Council Hundred (Consell de Cent Iurats) met with them November 10, 1612, on July 11 and November 9, 1613. At that time the head of the Narros was Don Roque Guinart mentioned in the works of Miguel de Cervantes Saavedra, Don Quixote.

The period of peace ended by a confrontation between a Cadells and Don Juan de Serallonga (Narro) and, in 1633, Fontanella, head of the Cadells, caught Don Roque and hung him himself. With this, some families of the Narro family decided to migrate to other parts of the Iberian Peninsula, the Balearic Islands and the New World, becoming in some cases the surname Navarro, Nafarro, Najarro, Narros, etc.

In Mexico the descendants of this lineage have excelled in all areas, from business and politics, to the arts.

The 19th century saw writers of the stature of Manuel Acuña and artists like Maria Narro Narro Valdes. Also, Narro entrepreneurs like Francisco Acuña, Antonio Narro Narro Rodriguez and Ignacio Gomez. The XX century was not left behind in outstanding examples as Ignacio Narro Garcia, a leading implementer of the Free Trade Agreement of Latin America (LAFTA), Dr. Jose Narro Robles, major medical and rector of the maximum house of studies of Mexico (UNAM) and current Secretary of Health.

== Surname simplification ==
Don Pedro Alonso of Naharro, born between 1575 and 1585 married Magdalena Bartholome in 1608 in Hervias, in what now is known as La Rioja. His son, Don Domingo Alonso de Naharro and Bartholome, also from Hervías, was baptized on November 5, 1628. He married Dona Ysabel de Zerezeda . Daughter of Don Diego and Dona Maria Solares Zerezeda. Don Pedro simplifies the surname and leaves it as "Narro".

== Immigration to North America ==
Don Domingo Alonso de Narro and Zerezeda, originally from Villar de Torre, was baptized on February 27, 1666. He married Dona Maria Angulo, originally from Badarán, both locations currently in La Rioja. She was baptized on April 23, 1768, in the parish of her hometown. Daughter of Don Antonio Angulo Pérez and Maria de San Juan, was born on January 24, 1633, in Badarán. Don Antonio was the son of Don Juan Angulo and Dona Maria Perez and Maria de San Juan was the daughter of Pedro and Dona Francisca San Juan of Zeballos, all these from in Badarán, Spain.

His son, Don Francisco Alonso de Narro and Angulo, a native of Villar de Torre, was baptized on October 13, 1701, and moves to New Spain (Mexico) in 1716. He married Dona Ysabel Martinez Guajardo and Montes de Oca in the parish of Santiago de Saltillo on September 15, 1724.

The marriage of Don Francisco Alonso de Narro y Angulo (some say the "Alonso" was his surname and not a middle name) and Dona Maria Ysabel Martinez Guaxardo and Montes de Oca produced three offspring; Dona Maria Rosa, Don Juan Jose Francisco Alonso and Don Joseph Miguel. From them derive all decedents that today live in Mexico, US and places further away such as Switzerland.

== Distinguished family members ==
=== Don Bartolome Torres Naharro ===
Dramatist, poet and theoretician of the Spanish Renaissance theater, born in Torre de Miguel Sesmero in Badajoz in 1485. He studied philosophy and the humanities at the University of Salamanca, then ordained as a priest and then enlist as a soldier. Lived some time in Italy, in Rome and Naples, where he wrote his first works (Serafina, Soldadesca, Trofea, Jacinta and Tinelaria and Himenea). Don Bartholome wrote a total of nine plays, all in the genre of comedy.

=== Don Roque Guinart ===
Mentioned in the works of Miguel de Cervantes Saavedra, Don Quixote, as head of the Narro, in its dispute with the Cadell family.

=== Don Alejandro Arguedas Narro ===
In the Knights Hospitaller he made probanzas of his four names, in 1751. Priest and Natural Santed, Zaragoza.

=== Don Tomás Litala Dexart, Castelvi y Narro ===
In the Order of Calatrava he made probanzas, natural Caller, Sardinia in 1682.

=== Don Juan Francisco Castellví de Jarte, Lanza y Narro ===
In the same order he proved all his surname, being of the same nature and Marquis of Laconi, in 1696.

=== Don Francisco Alonso de Narro y Angulo ===
The first Narro to move to Mexico and head of the family in this territory was Don Francisco Alonso de Narro and Angulo. The son of Don Domingo Alonso de Narro and Maria de Angulo and San Juan, was born in Villar de Torre in 1701, then under the bishopric of Calahorra, belonging to the Autonomous Community of La Rioja.

Don Francisco immigrated to North America as the right-hand man of Don Baltasar de Zúñiga Guzmán Sotomayor y Mendoza, Duke of Arión and Marquis of Valero, Viceroy of New Spain (later president of the Council of the Indies), between 1714 and 1716. He married Dona Maria Ysabel Martinez Guaxardo and Montes de Oca, on September 15, 1724, in the village of Santiago del Saltillo. She was the legitimate daughter of Captain Miguel Martinez Guaxardo and Aguirre and Petronila Montes de Oca and Ayala, who married on May 7, 1692 in the same town. She was the paternal granddaughter of Captain Don Juan Martinez Guaxardo and Flores Valdes and Dona Ana Clara de Aguirre Guillen and Ábrego; paternal great-granddaughter of Lieutenant Juan Martinez Guaxardo and Rodriguez; paternal great-granddaughter, Captain Francisco Martinez Guajardo and Dona Ines Rodriguez Navarro; daughter of the Captain Don Juan Navarro and Dona Maria Rodriguez de Sosa, daughter of Don Baltasar this and Dona Ines Sosa Rodríguez, one of the most important founders of Saltillo and novohispano northeast.

=== Don Valentín Garcia y Narro ===
Doctor and teacher, professor of philosophy and theology at the Pontifical Tridentine Seminary Real and court of New Spain, master of arts and doctor of sacred theology; dean of both faculties and all its cloister at the Royal Pontifical University of Mexico City, in addition to his conciliatory and rectorate. He served as Bishop in Coyoacan. He was born in February 1724 and died in March 1801.

=== Don Francisco de Jesus Narro Acuna ===
Born in Saltillo on October 16, 1855, was a member of the second generation that graduated from the famous academic institution Ateneo Fuente. Visionary and entrepreneur, obtained great achievements in the field of agriculture and livestock, annexing lands inherited some from the time of Captain Don Alberto del Canto, founder of Saltillo, multiple ranches and farms. He co-founded the Bank of Coahuila; pioneer in the exploitation and export of istle; alderman and mayor of General Cepeda in 1887. This last position is occupied in Saltillo in 1910. He presided over the General Grain Meeting of Coahuila, regulating everything related to grains in that state.

=== Don Pascual Marquina Narro ===
Born in Calatayud, Zaragoza on May 16, 1873, he was a great Spanish composer and orchestra director. He studied composition and harmony at the Municipal Conservatory of Music Barcelona, under the supervision of José María Varela Silvari (1848–1926), Sorolla y Martínez Bonet, among others. In 1901 he becomes director of the Band of the infantry regiment of Llerena and later, in 1916, the Band of the Second Engineer Regiment Sappers of Madrid, which gave many concerts both in Spain and abroad.

In 1914 he becomes director of Teatro de la Zarzuela.

He was the artistic director of the record label company "La voz de su Amo" for 18 years.

He was awarded the Victoria Cross of the United Kingdom for a composition that merged the Spanish anthem, Marcha Real, and the folksong God save the Queen, on the occasion of the wedding of Alfonso XIII King of Spain with Victoria Eugenia Battenberg.

He was also honored with the cross and the plaque of the Order of San Hermenegildo, the Military Merit Cross and the Cross of the Rif. He was also the composer of the "King of Pasodoble", world famous Spain cañí, which originally bore the name of The Cañí patronista dedicated to Almanseñas patronista Jose Lopez de la Osa. The work was premiered in Almansa (locality in which Jose Lopez resided) on the street Aniceto Coloma in the door of his home, played by the Band of Engineers of Madrid.

There are streets dedicated to Paschal Marquina in the cities of Cartagena, Calatayud, Zaragoza, Oviedo, Montilla and Villena.

=== Don Antonio Narro Rodriguez ===
Philanthropist and renowned farmer and rancher. In his will left, accompanied by his sister, Dona Trinidad Narro Mass, the necessary payments for the construction and operation of an agricultural school, now the University Autonoma Agraria Antonio Narro, recognized as the best academic institution for the study of agriculture in Mexico. Doña Trinidad Narro Rodriguez, widow of Don Enrique Mass, left all his possessions to charities Saltillo as Trinidad Narro Asylum Mass, the House of trades and the Vincent de Paul Hospital, among other works.

=== Dona Maria Narro Valdes ===
Renowned painter and first one to introduce in her work issues from Saltillo. Born in Saltillo on September 23, 1877, legitimate daughter of Don Pablo Narro and Narro, paternal granddaughter of Pablo Narro and Francisca Narro Galindo, daughter of Don Juan Esteban Narro Lizarraráz and Cuellar and Dona Maria Ignacia Galindo Valdes, married on June 10, 1826, the last son of Don Jose Ignacio González Narro and Dona Blasa of Lizarraráz Cuellar, and Dona Eleuteria Valdes Rodriguez; born on February 20, 1858, and married in Saltillo on June 26, 1874, daughter of Don Miguel Valdes, born in Arteaga, Coahuila and Mrs. Anastasia Rodriguez. Dona Maria house in 1897 with the famous writer, lawyer Jose Garcia Rodriguez, director of the Ateneo Fuente on three occasions, founder of the University of Coahuila (now Autonomous University of Coahuila), First chronicler of Saltillo (1944–1948) and member of Congress of Coahuila in 1913, when he follows Venustiano Carranza in ignorance to General Victoriano Huerta as president of Mexico, board member of the Asylum Narro – Mass with his in-laws, Francisco Narro Acuña, an institution that benefited Saltillo society for many years.

=== Don Manuel Acuna Narro ===
Poet who developed in the stylized romantic Mexican intellectualism of the time born on August 27, 1849, in Saltillo, Coahuila, along with a group of select intellectual characters. Don Manuel founded the Literary Society of Nezahualcoyotl in one of the courtyards of the old convent of San Jeronimo. Among his most recognized literary works are the following; The Renaissance (1869), The Free Thinker (1870), the Past (1872) and Complete Poems. Don Manuel ended his life on December 6, 1873, by being poisoned with potassium cyanide. It is said that the cause of his suicide was that he was in love with Doña Rosario de la Peña and Llerena, who at the time was a couple of Mexican poet Jose Maria Bustillos.

=== Don Jesus Narro Sancho ===
Skilled footballer born in Tolosa, Guipúzcoa, Spain, on January 4, 1922. As midfielder was part of Real Murcia for three seasons (1944–1945, 1945–1946 and 1946–1947) scoring 10 goals, Real Sporting de Gijón for one season (1952–1953) scoring one goal and at his peak was part of the Real Madrid Club de Futbol for six seasons (1948–1949, 1949–1950, 1950–1951, 1951–1952, 1952–1953 and 1953– 1954) scoring 13 goals and winning the league title in his final season with the team "merengue" along with the great Alfredo Di Stefano. His most outstanding performance was on January 14, 1951, by being on the initial line-up and performing a hat-trick (min. '8 '17 and '29) in the Spanish derby against FC Barcelona. Real Madrid won the game at the Chamartin Stadium by a score of 4–1.Don Jesus scored another hat-trick on October 15, 1950 against Club Deportivo Alcoyano and four goals on October 8, 1950 against the now extinct UE Lleida in Catalonia.

With a total of 13.452 minutes in the Primera Division of Spain, starting in 162 games, Don Sancho Narro Jesus retired from professional soccer at age 31, cheered by 75.145 spectators in the Chamartin Stadium, now known as Santiago Bernabeu stadium.

=== Don Miguel Narros Barrios ===
Spanish theater director' born in the city of Madrid on November 7, 1928. After completing his training at the Royal School of Dramatic Arts in Madrid and continue his studies in France, Don Miguel won the chair at the Royal School of Dramatic Art.

As director he begins his activities at the Spanish Univarsitario Theatre (TEUs) and later continued at the Teatro Estudio de Madrid ('61 -'68), the Independent Experimental Theatre ('68 –'78) and Castilian Stable Theater (1978–1980). In 1971 he directs the Auto Sacramental Hospital Jose de Valdivieso in Spanish Repertory Theatre in New York City at the invitation of René Buch, Artistic Director and Gilberto Zaldivar, Executive Producer. During his career, Don Miguel was Director of the Spanish Theater twice (1966–1970 and 1984–1989). Don Miguel received numerous awards which include the Ordre des Arts et des Lettres in France, the National Theatre Prize (on two occasions), the Gold Medal of the City of Valladolid (on three occasions) and the Prize Festival of Classic Theater of Almagro.

=== Don Jose Narro Robles ===
Academic, doctor, and Mexican politician born on December 5, 1948, in Saltillo, Coahuila. Former rector of the highest seat of learning in Mexico, the National Autonomous University of Mexico (UNAM) (1907–1915) and current Secretary of Health of Mexico.

=== Don Armando Fuentes Aguirre ===
Mexican writer and journalist, best known as "Caton", born on July 8, 1938, in Saltillo, Coahuila, son of Mariano Fuentes Flores and Carmen Aguirre de Fuentes.

=== Don Ignacio Narro Etchegaray ===
Businessman, editor, writer, printer and historian, born on July 16, 1954, in Mexico City, son of Don Ignacio Narro García (b. 1925) and Doña Beatriz Martha María Etchegaray Olavarría (b. 1930). Don Ignacio was appointed as the successor of the Spanish nobility title of 5th Count of Guadalupe del Peñasco by the grace of His Majesty Felipe VI, King of Spain in 2016. Married to Doña Ana Aurora Laborín Azcárraga (b. 1954), daughter of Enrique Laborín Nanetti (b. 1910) and Socórro Azcárraga Reyes Retana (b. 1930), March 1, 1980. They procreated four children: Don Ignacio Narro Laborín (b. 1981), Don Patricio Narro Laborín (b. 1984), Doña Viviana Sofía Narro Laborín (b. 1990) and Doña Ana Loreto Narro Laborín (b. 1994).

== Related Places ==
- Narros
- Narros de Saldueña
- Narros del Puerto
- Narros del Castillo
- Narros de Matalayegua
- Narros de Cuellar
- Palace of Narros
- Gomeznarro
- Fuente de Pedro Naharro
- Naharros del Rio
- Naharros de Valdunciel

== Bibliography ==
- Muñoz Altea, Fernando; Blasones y apellidos, tomo 2, (México, 2016). Grupo Impresores Unidos.
- Durón Jiménez Martha; Narro Etchegaray Ignacio; Los Narro, origen de una tradición en el noreste mexicano. (México, 1994) Artes Gráficas Integradas,
- Madoz Pascual; Diccionario geográfico-estadístico-histórico de España y sus posesiones de Ultramar XII. (Madrid, 1849).
- Cervantes Saavedra de, Miguel; Don Quijote de la Mancha. (México, 1982). Espasa-Calpe, Colección Austral.
- Gutiérrez Robledo, José Luis; et al. (2011). Memoria mudejar en la Moraña. España; 2011). ASODEMA.
- Cervantes Saavedra de, Miguel. Don quijote de la Mancha. Colección Austral de Espasa Calpe; 1982).
- Libros de Hervías y Bañares. No. 1, folio 84V

== External references ==
- Cine y educación: «Don Quijote en el cine» Universidad de Huelva
- El Palacio de Narros Wikimapia.org
- Ficha documental en la Biblioteca Nacional de España
- Verdugos: Asesinatos brutales y otras historias secretas de militares
- Avatares de la vida
- Familia Rodriguez Narro: El Morillo, descanso para extranjeros
- El Palacio de Narros Historiadeguipuzcoa.blogspot.com
- Dr. José Narro Robles habla sin solemnidad de su pasado
- Familia, punto nodal de acciones y cuidados de las salud: Narro Robles
- El Palacio de Narros en turismoa.euskadi.net
