= Narros (disambiguation) =

Narros is a municipality in Soria, Castile and León, Spain.

Narros can also refer to:

- Narros de Matalayegua, a municipality in Salamanca, Castile and León, Spain
- Narros de Saldueña, a municipality in Ávila, Castile and León, Spain
- Narros del Castillo, a municipality in Ávila, Castile and León, Spain
- Narros del Puerto, a municipality in Ávila, Castile and León, Spain

== See also ==
- Narro (disambiguation)
