= Naro (disambiguation) =

Naro is a town in Sicily, Italy.

Naro may also refer to:

- Naro language, a Khoe language from Botswana
- Naro Space Center, South Korean launch center
  - Naro-1, South Korean launcher
- Naro (restaurant), a Korean restaurant in New York City

== Places ==
- Naro, Solomon Islands
- Naro, island and barangay of Cawayan, Masbate, Philippines
- Naro-Fominsky District, district in Moscow Oblast, Russia
  - Naro-Fominsk, town and the administrative center of Naro-Fominsky District
- Naro Gewog, village in Thimphu District, Bhutan
- Naro Moru, town in central Kenya
- Naro Moru River, Kenya

== People ==
- Costantino Patrizi Naro (1798–1876), cardinal
- Jailani Naro (1929–2000), an Indonesian politician
- Naro Hari Shrestha (b. 1996), an Indian professional footballer
- Phil Naro (1958–2021), an American musician

== Acronym ==
- National Agriculture and Food Research Organization (Japan)
- Nuclear Accident Response Organisation (United Kingdom)

== See also ==
- Nara (disambiguation)
- Narro (disambiguation)
- Nero (disambiguation)
