= Narrowing =

Narrowing may refer to:

- Narrowing (computer science), a type of algorithm for solving equations between symbolic expressions
  - Narrowing of algebraic value sets, a method for the elimination of values from a solution set which are inconsistent with the equations being solved
- Narrowing (historical linguistics), a type of semantic change
- Collisional narrowing of a spectral line due to collisions of the emitting species
- Motional narrowing of a resonant frequency due to the inhomogeneity of the system averaging out over time
- Perceptual narrowing, a process in brain development
- Q-based narrowing, a concept in pragmatics
- Stenosis, the narrowing of a blood vessel or other tubular organ

== See also ==
- Narrow (disambiguation)
