= Nara =

Nara or Na-ra may refer to:

== Places and jurisdictions ==
=== Japan ===
- Nara Prefecture, a prefecture of Japan
  - Nara (city), the capital city of Nara Prefecture, Japan
  - Nara Basin, a valley in Nara Prefecture

=== Pakistan ===
- Nara, Attock, a village in Attock District, Punjab
- Nara, Jhelum, a village in Jhelum District, Punjab
- Nara, Rawalpindi, a village in Kahuta Tehsil, Rawalpindi District, Punjab
- Nara, Abbottabad, a Union Council of Abbottabad District, Khyber Pakhtunkwa
- Nara Canal, an excavated waterway in Sindh province, Pakistan

=== Elsewhere ===
- Nara, an ancient Roman city in Tunisia, now called Bir El Hafey
- Nara, Mali, a town in Mali
- Nara (Oka), a river in Russia
- Nara River (India), a river in Gujarat, India
- Nara Burnu, a cape in Turkey

== People and society ==
- Nara people, a Nilotic ethnic minority inhabiting Eritrea
- Nara language, the mother tongue of the Nara people
- Nara clan, a Jurchen-Manchu clan and surname
- National Radical Camp or Nara Party, several Polish nationalist groups

== People with the name Nara ==
=== Given name ===
- Nara Nath Acharya (1906–1988), Nepalese poet
- Nara Apaya, king of the Mrauk-U Dynasty of Arakan
- Nara Bahadur Bista, Nepalese politician
- Nara Bahadur Dahal (born 1960), Nepalese long-distance runner
- Nara Falcón (born 1981), Mexican synchronized swimmer
- Jang Na-ra (born 1981), South Korean female singer
- Nara Bahadur Karmacharya, Nepalese politician
- Nara Kollery (died 2015), Indian sound recordist
- Kwon Nara (born 1991), South Korean female singer
- Nara Leão (1942–1989), Brazilian female singer
- Nara Bhupal Shah (1697–1743), king of the Gorkha state in Nepal
- Nara Smith (born 2001), fashion model and internet personality

=== Surname ===
- Erika Nara, Japanese Paralympic swimmer
- Kurumi Nara (born 1991), Japanese tennis player
- Nara Lokesh (born 1983), Indian male politician
- Rao Nara (1420–1487), crown Prince of Nadol, India
- Setsuo Nara (奈良 節雄; born 1936), Japanese basketball player
- Takeji Nara (1868–1962), general in the Imperial Japanese Army
- Tatsuki Nara (born 1993), Japanese footballer
- Tatunca Nara (born 1941), German-Brazilian jungle guide who invented the lost city of Akakor
- Tōru Nara, Japanese voice actor
- Wanda Nara (born 1986), Argentine media personality and football agent
- Yoshitomo Nara (born 1959), Japanese artist
- Zaira Nara (born 1988), Argentine model and TV host
- Ula Nara Duoqimuli, Empress consort of Qing dynasty Yongzheng Emperor

== Arts and mythology ==
- Nara (Arjuna), Arjuna in his previous birth was Nara
- Nara (album), by Emily Wurramara
- Nara (comics), a fictional character from Marvel Comics
- One of the twins Nara-Narayana in Hindu mythology
- "Nara", song from the album Unearthed by E.S. Posthumus
- Shikamaru Nara, fictional character in the manga and anime series Naruto
- "Nara", "Arrival In Nara" and "Leaving Nara", songs from the 2014 album This Is All Yours by alt-J
- "Nara", setting of the children's television series Waybuloo

== Other uses ==
- Nara period, period of Japanese history, named after the former capital city
- Japanese ship Nara, (楢 / なら; "oak"), several Japanese ships
- Nara plant (Acanthosicyos horridus), a melon species of the Namib desert

== NARA as an acronym ==
NARA may stand for:

- National Alien Registration Authority, a defunct agency of the Government of Pakistan
- National Amateur Rowing Association, the governing body for rowing by working men in Britain prior to 1956
- National Archives and Records Administration, an agency of the U.S. government
- Neale Analysis of Reading Ability, an assessment of comprehension and word reading accuracy

== See also ==
- Narra (disambiguation)
- Naro (disambiguation)
- Nari (disambiguation)
