= Narra =

Narra may refer to:

== People ==
- Narra Venkateswara Rao (died 2009), Indian actor
- Narra Raghava Reddy (1924–2015), Indian politician
- Ravi Kumar Narra (born 1963), Indian social worker

== Places ==
- Narra, Bokaro, Jharkhand, India
- Narra, Palawan, Philippines

== Science ==
- Pterocarpus, a tree genus commonly known as Narra in Asia
  - Pterocarpus indicus, a species of Pterocarpus commonly known as narra
- Tropical Storm Narra, a 2026 Pacific Ocean tropical cyclone

== See also ==
- Nara (disambiguation)
- Narda (disambiguation)
- Narro (disambiguation)
