= Doppler broadening =

Phenomenon in physics

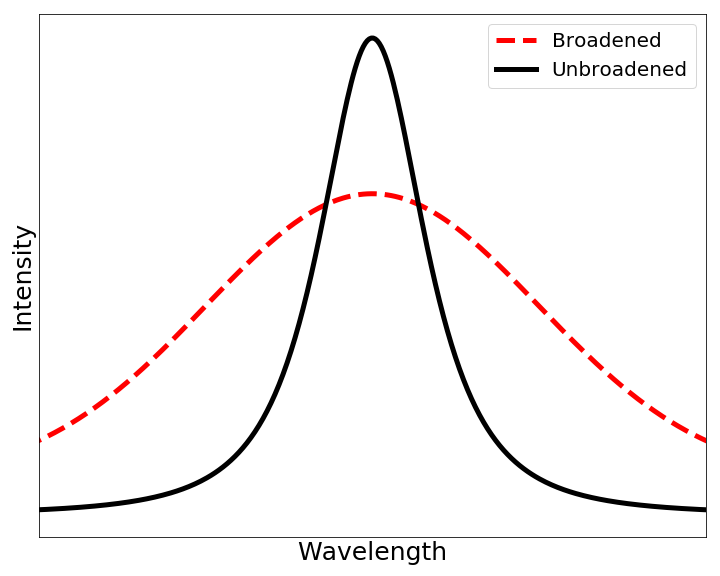
An example of a Doppler broadened line profile. The solid line represents an un-broadened emission profile, and the dashed line represents a broadened emission profile.

In atomic physics, Doppler broadening is broadening of spectral lines due to the Doppler effect caused by a distribution of velocities of atoms or molecules. Different velocities of the emitting (or absorbing) particles result in different Doppler shifts, the cumulative effect of which is the emission (absorption) line broadening. This resulting line profile is known as a Doppler profile.

A particular case is the thermal Doppler broadening due to the thermal motion of the particles. Then, the broadening depends only on the frequency of the spectral line, the mass of the emitting particles, and their temperature, and therefore can be used for inferring the temperature of an emitting (or absorbing) body being spectroscopically investigated.

== Derivation (non-relativistic case) ==
When a particle moves (e.g., due to the thermal motion) towards the observer, the emitted radiation is shifted to a higher frequency. Likewise, when the emitter moves away, the frequency is lowered. In the non-relativistic limit, the Doppler shift is

$f = f_0 \left(1 + \frac{v}{c}\right),$

where $f$ is the observed frequency, $f_0$ is the frequency in the rest frame, $v$ is the velocity of the emitter towards the observer, and $c$ is the speed of light.

Since there is a distribution of speeds both toward and away from the observer in any volume element of the radiating body, the net effect will be to broaden the observed line. If $P_v(v) \,dv$ is the fraction of particles with velocity component $v$ to $v + dv$ along a line of sight, then the corresponding distribution of the frequencies is

$$P_f(f) \,df = P_v(v_f) \frac{dv}{df} \,df,$$

where $v_f = c \left(\frac{f}{f_0} - 1\right)$ is the velocity towards the observer corresponding to the shift of the rest frequency $f_0$ to $f$. Therefore,

$P_f(f) \,df = \frac{c}{f_0} P_v\left[c \left(\frac{f}{f_0} - 1\right)\right] \,df.$

We can also express the broadening in terms of the wavelength $\lambda$. Since $v/c \ll 1$, $\left|f/f_0 -1\right| \ll 1$, and so $\frac{\lambda - \lambda_0}{\lambda_0} \approx -\frac{f - f_0}{f_0}$. Therefore,

$P_\lambda(\lambda) \,d\lambda = \frac{c}{\lambda_0} P_v\left[c \left(1 - \frac{\lambda}{\lambda_0}\right)\right] \,d\lambda.$

=== Thermal Doppler broadening ===
In the case of the thermal Doppler broadening, the velocity distribution is given by the Maxwell distribution

$$P_v(v) \,dv = \sqrt{\frac{m}{2\pi kT}}\,\exp\left(-\frac{mv^2}{2kT}\right) \,dv,$$

where $m$ is the mass of the emitting particle, $T$ is the temperature, and $k$ is the Boltzmann constant.

Then

$$P_f(f) \,df = \frac{c}{f_0} \sqrt{\frac{m}{2\pi kT}}\,\exp\left(-\frac{m\left[c\left(\frac{f}{f_0} - 1\right)\right]^2}{2kT}\right) \,df.$$

We can simplify this expression as

$$P_f(f) \,df = \sqrt{\frac{mc^2}{2\pi kT f_0^2}}\,
\exp\left(-\frac{mc^2\left(f - f_0\right)^2}{2kT f_0^2}\right) \,df,$$

which we immediately recognize as a Gaussian profile with the standard deviation

$$\sigma_f = \sqrt{\frac{kT}{mc^2}} \,f_0$$

and full width at half maximum (FWHM)

$\Delta f_\text{FWHM} = \sqrt{\frac{8kT \ln 2}{mc^2}}f_0.$

== Applications and caveats ==
In astronomy and plasma physics, the thermal Doppler broadening is one of the explanations for the broadening of spectral lines, and as such gives an indication for the temperature of observed material. Other causes of velocity distributions may exist, though, for example, due to turbulent motion. For a fully developed turbulence, the resulting line profile is generally very difficult to distinguish from the thermal one. Another cause could be a large range of macroscopic velocities resulting, e.g., from the receding and approaching portions of a rapidly spinning accretion disk. Finally, there are many other factors that can also broaden the lines. For example, a sufficiently high particle number density may lead to significant Stark broadening.

Doppler broadening can also be used to determine the velocity distribution of a gas given its absorption spectrum. In particular, this has been used to determine the velocity distribution of interstellar gas clouds.

Schematic demonstrating how thermal motion broadens the absorption resonance.

The thermal motion of atoms broadens the resonance absorption lines (the area under the resonance remains essentially constant); this effect is taken advantage of in nuclear reactors as an inherent safety and stability feature. This broadening reduces the energy self-shielding, allowing a larger number of neutrons to be captured in resonances (the resonance integral grows and the resonance escape probability falls). In low-enriched fuel this increased capture is dominated by fertile nuclei (e.g. uranium-238), so the fuel temperature coefficient is negative and acts immediately as fission heat is deposited in the fuel. The same broadening also contributes in fast reactors, where it forms part of the prompt fuel temperature response.

Saturated absorption spectroscopy, also known as Doppler-free spectroscopy, can be used to find the true frequency of an atomic transition without cooling a sample down to temperatures at which the Doppler broadening is negligible.

== See also ==
- Mössbauer effect
- Dicke effect
