= Narrow =

Narrow may refer to:

- The Narrow, rock band from South Africa
- Narrow banking, proposed banking system that would eliminate bank runs and the need for a deposit insurance
- Narrow-gauge railway, a railway that has a track gauge narrower than the 4 ft 8½ in of standard gauge railways
- Narrow vs wide format, a style of displaying tabular data
- Narrowboat or narrow boat, a boat of a distinctive design made to fit the narrow canals of Great Britain
- Narrow (album), a 2012 album by Austrian musical project Soap&Skin
- "Narrow", a song by Mayday Parade from Black Lines

== See also ==
- Narro (disambiguation)
- Narrows (disambiguation)
- The Narrows (disambiguation)
- Narrowing (disambiguation)
