= The Narrows (disambiguation) =

The Narrows is a strait in New York City separating Brooklyn and Staten Island.

The Narrows may also refer to:

== Places ==
=== Antarctica ===
- The Narrows (Antarctica), a strait

=== Australia ===
- The Narrows (Victoria), a strait of the Western Port Bay between the towns of Newhaven on the Phillip Island and San Remo in West Gippsland
- The Narrows, Northern Territory, a town
- The Narrows, Queensland, a channel and locality in Gladstone Region, Queensland
- The Narrows of the Swan River spanned by Narrows Bridge (Perth)

=== Canada ===
- The Narrows, Halifax, a strait in Halifax Harbour, Nova Scotia
- The Narrows, Manitoba, a community in Division No. 19, Manitoba
- The Narrows, St. John's, the entrance to the harbour at St. John's, Newfoundland
- The Narrows, an section between Upper and Lower Arrow Lakes

=== Caribbean ===
- The Narrows (Saint Kitts and Nevis), the strait between the islands of Saint Kitts and Nevis

=== United States ===
- The Narrows (Alaska), a channel in Southeast Alaska
- The Narrows including Celilo Falls, part of a series of rapids upstream of The Dalles, Oregon
- The Narrows (Knox County, Texas), a narrow ridge separating the watersheds of the Wichita River and Brazos River
- The Narrows (Pennsylvania), a water gap on the Raystown Branch Juniata River in Bedford County, Pennsylvania
- Informally, the Tacoma Narrows in Pierce County, Washington
- The Narrows (Zion National Park), along the North Fork Virgin River in Zion National Park, Utah
- Informally, the Cumberland Narrows, a water gap located northwest of Cumberland, Maryland
- Informally, the Kent Narrows in Queen Anne's County, Maryland

== Other uses ==
- The Narrows (Connelly novel), a 2004 Bosch novel by Michael Connelly
- The Narrows (Malfi novel), a 2012 novel by Ronald Malfi
- The Narrows (Petry novel), a 1953 novel by Ann Petry
- The Narrows (film), a 2008 American film
- The Narrows (album), a 2016 album by Grant-Lee Phillips
- The Narrows, a fictional neighbourhood in Gotham City in the Batman stories

== See also ==
- Narrows (disambiguation)
- Narrow (disambiguation)
- Narro (disambiguation)
