= Splatalogue =

Catalogue of spectral lines

Splatalogue is a database for astronomical spectroscopy which contains information on nearly six million spectral lines and is maintained by the National Radio Astronomy Observatory (NRAO). The name is a portmanteau of "spectral line catalogue".

It contains data from seven catalogues and other sources of spectral line data and is accessible via an online search interface.

== Spectral lines ==
The spectral lines contained in Splatalogue range in frequency from 400 to 3.22×10^{18} Hz (400 Hz to 3.22 PHz), or equivalently, wavelengths from 97.25nm to 749.5 km). About 99.99% of the lines are in the microwave, millimeter, and submillimeter spectral regimes (1 GHz to 10 THz), as the catalogue is for use mainly by observational astronomers using instruments such as the Atacama Large Millimeter/Submillimeter Array and NRAO's Karl G. Jansky Very Large Array and Robert C. Byrd Green Bank Telescope.
