= Narrows (disambiguation) =

A narrows is a fluvial landform.

Narrows may also refer to:

== Places ==
=== Geographical features ===
- Narrows Creek, a stream in Sauk County, Wisconsin, US
- Narrows Inlet, British Columbia, Canada
- Narrows Pond, two small twin lakes in Winthrop, Maine, US

=== Settlements ===
- Narrows, Georgia, US
- Narrows, Oregon, US
- Narrows, Virginia, US
  - Narrows Commercial Historic District
- Grand Rivers, Kentucky, US, possibly originally known as Narrows
- Narrows, a community in Leeds and the Thousand Islands, Ontario, Canada

=== Structures ===
- Narrows Bridge (disambiguation)
- Narrows Dam, north of Murfreesboro, Arkansas, US
- Narrows Dam, containing Badin Lake, North Carolina, US
  - Narrows Dam and Power Plant Complex, a historic district
- Narrows High School, Narrows, Virginia
- Narrows Plantation House, Lake Arthur, Louisiana, US

== Other uses ==
- Narrows (band), an American mathcore band

== See also ==
- The Narrows (disambiguation)
