= Count of Guadalupe del Peñasco =

Spanish noble title

Countship of Guadalupe del Peñasco
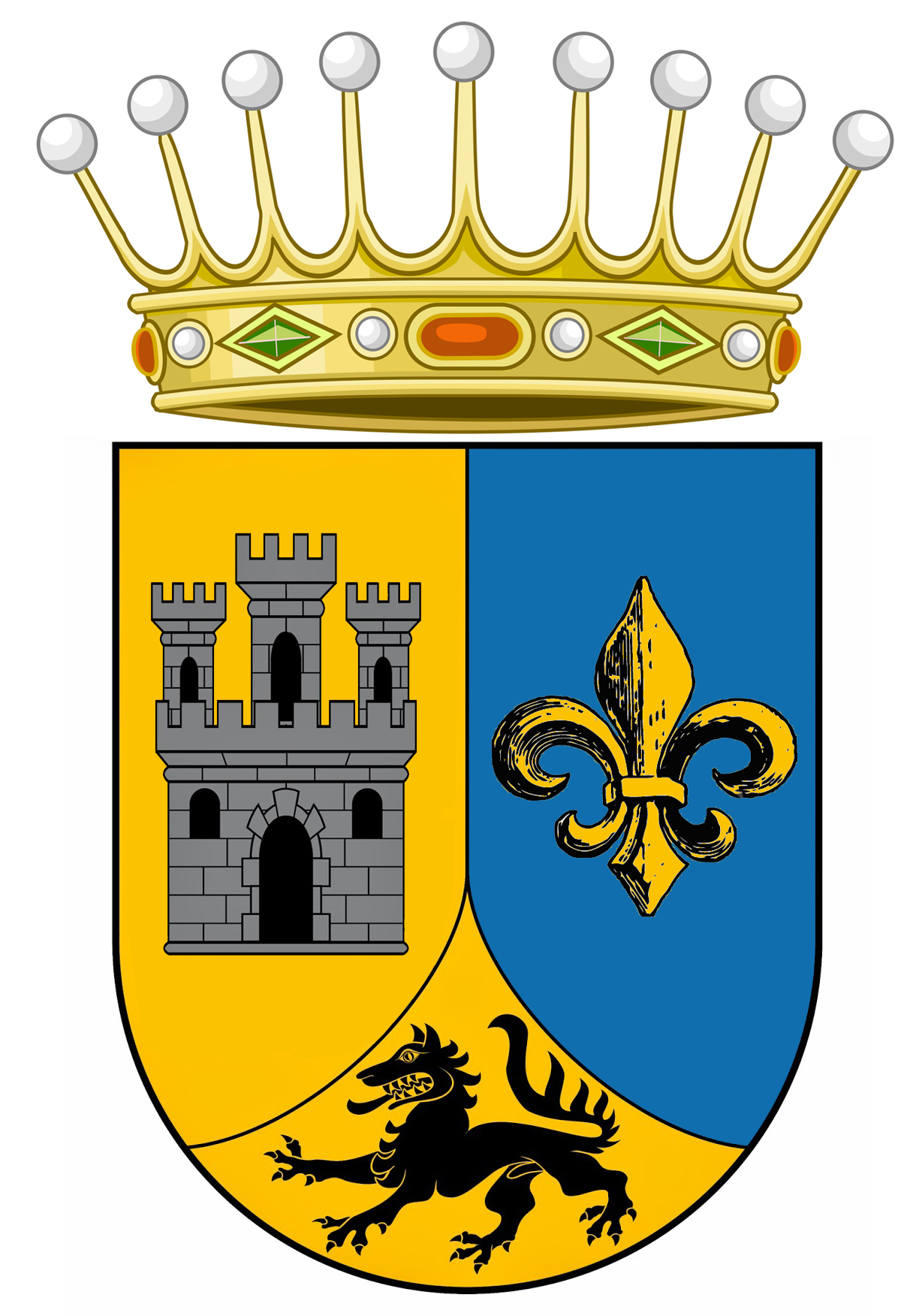
- Creation date: 1768
- Created by: King Charles III of Spain
- Peerage: Spanish
- First holder: Don Francisco de Mora y Luna
- Present holder: Don Ignacio Narro Etchegaray
- Remainder to: Male-preference primogeniture

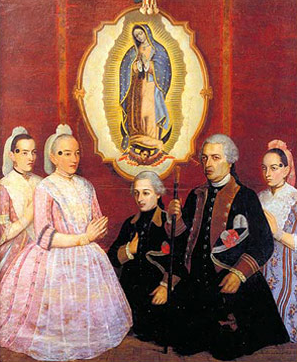
Don Francisco de Mora y Luna, First Count of Guadalupe del Peñasco

The Count of Guadalupe del Peñasco (Spanish: Conde de Guadalupe del Peñasco) is a title of Spanish nobility granted by King Charles III of Spain to Don Francisco Javier de Mora y Luna, Colonel of Dragons of the provincial militias on 26 January 1768.

== Coat of arms ==
The three tower stone castle with five Windows denotes grandness, protection and security; the Golden fleur-de-lis symbolizes generosity, perfection, light and life; the rampant Wolf embodies perseverance while hunting for a long period of time and adverse events. The shield's base colors blue and golden represent strength, loyalty and respect. The coat of arms has the count Crown awarded by the kingdom of Spain in 1768.

== Motto ==
The axiom of Count of Guadalupe del Peñasco is “Læva in circuitu oculos tuos et vide” in Latin, which translates to "Raise ones sight and gaze to ones surroundings". This motto was adopted, in 2002, by Mexican Museum of Design (MUMEDI), located in Mexico City.

== Counts of Guadalupe del Peñasco ==
| | Titleholder | Period |
Created by King Charles III of Spain
| I | Don Francisco Javier de Mora y Luna | 1768 - 1788 |
| II | Don Juan José Secundino de Mora y Luna Pérez Calderón | 1768 - 1805 |
| III | Don José Mariano Sánchez Espinosa y Pérez Calderón | 1805 - 1845 |
| IV | Don Adolfo Desentis Ortega | 1994 - 2011 |
| V | Don Ignacio Narro Etchegaray | Current |

== History ==
=== First Count (1768) ===
==== Don Francisco Javier de Mora y Luna ====
- After being made a Count and with the right to create a Majorat, by King Charles III of Spain, given his honorable actions benefiting the Spanish Crown, Don Francisco names the county as “County of our Lady of Guadalupe del Peñasco”. During his time, he has named Captain of horses and breastplates Cavalry Corps, established by the Courthouse of San Luis Potosí, for his contribution in the pacification of Pames, the rebel native Indians in that location. He was later promoted to Coronel of the Dragons of the Provincial Militias, given his contribution in the “turmoil of 1767”, granted by the Viceroy, Marques of Croix. Son of Don Manuel Mora y Gorrea and Mrs Antonia Luisa de Luna y Gama. Married with Mrs María Ildefonsa Bernarda Pérez Calderón León y Carrillo. Children Don Juan José Secundino, Mrs Manuela and Mrs María Josefa Paula de Mora y Luna Pérez Calderón.

=== Second Count (1788) ===
==== Don Juan José Secundino de Mora y Luna Pérez Calderón ====
- Married with María Rafaela Evaristo Jiménez de Cisneros Palomeque. Earned the rank of Colonel of Dragons. Having no children, he inherited the title and Majorat to his nephew, the son of his sister María Josefa Paula and José Mariano Sánchez Espinosa.

=== Third Count (1805) ===
==== Don José Mariano Sánchez Espinosa y Pérez Calderón ====
- Married with doña María Antonia Flores Alatorre Moscoso y Sandoval. They had José Mariano and José Joaquín Sánchez Espinosa y Flores Alatorre, married with sisters. José Mariano, born in 1777 y deceased in 1845, Achieved with his brother the baccalaureate degree and by 1805 he was a member of the Mexico City Chapter. He was a board member of Banco de Avío for Fomento de la Industria Nacional, from Museo Nacional y and Hospicio de los Pobres, among others. Became a widow in 1840 and married doña Vicenta Irolo, having no children. His son José Mariano Sánchez Espinosa y Flores Alatorre was born in 1807 and died in 1875. Married with doña Guadalupe Cervantes y Michaus, sister of the 13th Count of Santiago Calimaya and daughter of the 10th Marquis of Salinas de Río Pisuerga, 13th Adelantado Perpetuo de las Islas Filipinas, and granddaughter of Ana María Altamirano, who, beside the titles previously mentioned, had the nobiliary title of 5th Marquis of Salvatierra and descendant of the Mariscales de Castilla. Children: Don Antonio, Don Manuel y Doña Loreto Sánchez Espinosa y Cervantes.

=== Fourth Count (1994) ===
==== Don Adolfo Desentis y Ortega ====
- In 1994 a descendant of Mrs. Loreto Sánchez Espinosa y Cervantes, Don Adolfo Desentis y Ortega, with the approval of the Spanish Crown, restored the nobility title. Don Adolfo shortened the County name to only "Guadalupe del Peñasco". As a single man, Don Adolfo died without offspring in 2012.

=== Fifth Count (2016) ===
==== Don Ignacio Narro Etchegaray ====
- The descendant of don Francisco Javier de Mora y Luna was appointed by the Monarchy of Spain as the successor of the county in early 2016. Married to Doña Ana Aurora Laborín Azcarraga (b. 1954), daughter of Don Enrique Laborin Nanetti (b. 1910) and Doña Socorro Azcarraga Reyes Retana (b. 1930), the 1st of March in 1980. They procreated four children: Don Ignacio (b. 1981), Don Patricio (b. 1984), Doña Viviana Sofia (b. 1990) and Doña Ana Loreto (b. 1994) Narro Laborín.

== Family Tree ==
Francisco Javier de Mora y Luna; I Count of Guadalupe del Peñasco (1692-1752)
Juan Jose Secundino de Mora y Luna Perez Calderon; II Count of Guadalupe del Peñasco († 1781) | María Josefa Paula Mora y Luna Perez Calderón († 1783)
Mariano Sanchez Espinosa y Perez Calderon; III Count of de Guadalupe del Peñasco (1762-1814)
Jose Mariano Sanchez Espinosa y Flores Alatorre (1771-1836)
Manuel Espinosa y Cervantes (1822-1872) | Loreto Espinosa y Cervantes (1834-1916)
Concepcion Espinosa y Parra (1860-1936) | Manuel Ortega y Sanchez Espinosa (1856-1907)
Maria Luisa Olavarria Espinosa (1892-1982) | Beatriz Ortega y Hay (1897-1969)
Beatriz Martha Maria Etchegaray Olavarria (1930-1971) | Adolfo Desentis y Ortega; IV Count of Guadalupe del Peñasco (1925-2012)
Ignacio Narro Etchegaray; V Count of Guadalupe del Peñasco (n. 1954)

== Intervention in the Independence of Mexico ==
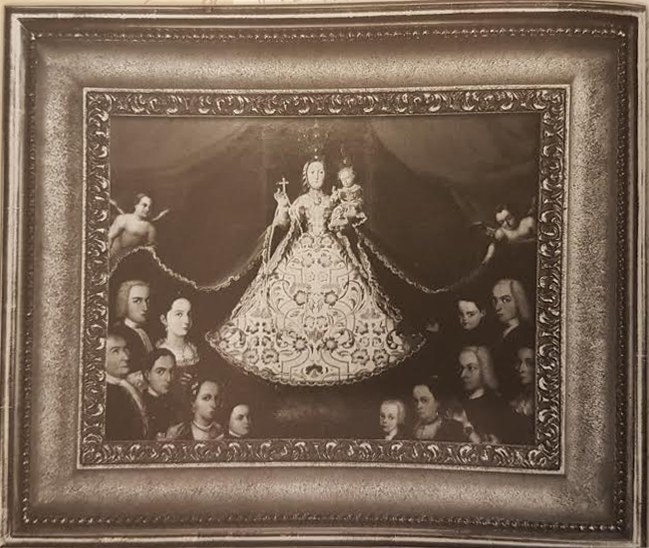
Portrait of the family of Francisco Javier de Mora y Luna

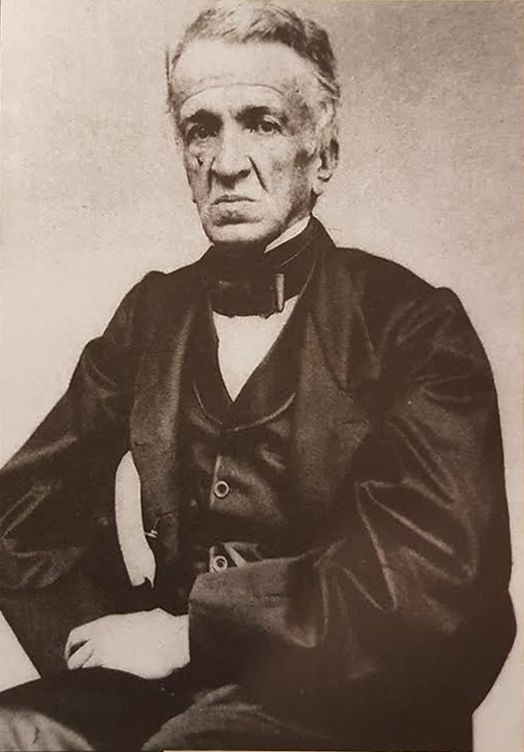
Portrait of Jose Mariano Sanchez Espinosa y Flores Alatorre

Letter in Spanish from the 3rd Count of Guadalupe del Peñasco to Lieutenant Colonel Juan Nepomuceno Oviedo, stating that emissaries of the Emperor Napoleon Bonaparte of France have been responsible of exciting the working class of Zacatecas into revolting.

"Don Juan de Oviedo.-

Mexico June 20 of 1810.-

Dear Friend: leave aside the issue of the departure of Fernandez on which only created the report and I welcome you not to endanger your opinion and good name; I only answer I contract on the news contained in the letter from Dr. Cos, that without a doubt I find it the most sensitive.

The emissaries of Napoleon have achieved a triumph of ignorance and few lights of the common people, raising this sedition to disunite the people of Zacatecas, because this is the maxim of the French, who want it to spread throughout the world, as they know well that its inhabitants divided into parties have no strength to resist them.

This game of languages, more powerful weapons, is what has given them their conquests, making more war with deceptions than bullets, and now we suspect much these wicked have shed their poison by other provinces, corrupting minds to achieve their ends.

I wish some were apprehended, to find out who seduced them, even if they have to be tortured, and prisoners, seducers, make them the same diligence, evacuating them to the source of sedition; because if this is not done effectively is very terrible our ruin them are excommunicated as I have read repeatedly in the edicts of the Holy Office and have heard of missionary parents; but they forget the rancor that has given them the emissaries of Napoleon.

They have had gachupines for many year in their land, and so have lived watching them find their flow without dissonance has made them and now, as if seen again, frightens them their neighborhood and fortune; Why, where you can come as remarkable and untimely move, and in a whole entire town? Leaves no doubt this hand movement that causes it covertly, blinding smoke with the unwary to thinking fleeing a purpose, they fall into a larger one.

God may establish a remedy in Zacatecas, and save the other provinces of the kingdom of such evils, because barter not see them, death is more than a thousand times more desirable.Try to infuse as soon as they come to you a big sedition fear, and let others do the same, for doing so, although it is up to our regret, we will not cooperate with it, rather have participle in recommending peace that left us Jesus Christ, and to die there in case we lost our lives preserving it.Our Lord to give you many years you want your most devoted friend who kisses his esteem and hand.-

Count of Peñasco.-

Postscript.Today Pedro Pablo Albares of Angostura left here and takes you to the images of Our Lady of Guadalupe and San Francisco de Paula that was you requested for the priest of Hedionda, which I hope will come to their satisfaction.-

Okay."

== Properties ==
Notarized documents of the Porfiriato era note that one of the haciendas of the first count in San Luis Potosí comprised 12,655 hectares (31,270 acres), and a second one in Querétaro included eight train stations. Using the benefits of becoming a Count, Francisco de Mora y Luna established a majorat that included:

- Hacienda of Peñasco
- Hacienda of Bocas
- Hacienda of Santa Rosa de Angostura
- Hacienda of Guanamé
- Hacienda of Cruces.
- Norias del Conde.
- Mines in Guadalcazar and Real de Catorce.

== Residence in Francisco I Madero Street ==
One of the properties that belonged to the first count during the 18th century was built to host the palace of Spanish conquistador Hernán Cortés, Marquis of the Valley of Oaxaca. The property was acquired from Don Martín Cortés, 2nd Marquis of the Valley of Oaxaca, son of the Marquis. During the time of the colony, the property was the addressed as the number 1 of Plateros street, the first estate around Mercaderes portal, just 10 feet away from Plaza Mayor, and the most prestigious street of the city.

The foundation of this property was built over the properties of the Aztec Emperor Moctezuma Ilhuicamina (1440–1469), where later his son, Emperor Axayácatl (brother of Emperor Tízoc) built his palace, also known as Axayácatl Palace. His son Emperor Moctezuma Xocoyotzin inherited the estate, and even though he constructed his own temple in the adjacent land, he kept his father's palace. In this pyramid, which lies underneath the residence of the Count, was where the emperor hosted Hernán Cortés and the Spanish conquistadors when they arrived to the great city of Tenochtitlan in 1519. At this same location emperor Moctezuma died a year later, either assassinated by the Spanish or stoned to death by his own people (there are several versions of his death). After the Spanish conquered Tenochtitlan, Don Hernan seized the palace and built his residence over it.

Nowadays this property hosts a hotel, a cafeteria, a private residence, and the Mexican Museum of Design (MUMEDI), located in Francisco I. Madero Street number 74, in colonia centro, Delegacion Cuahutemoc, just a few feet from the Zocalo of Mexico City.

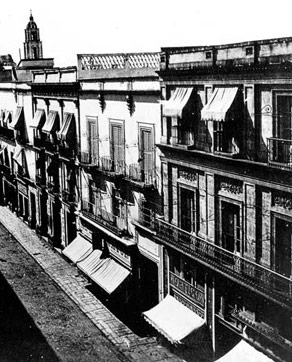
Exterior of Count Guadalupe del Peñasco's Residence

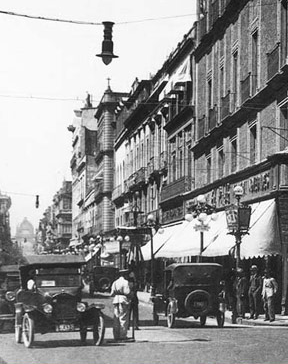
Exterior from street of Count Guadalupe del Peñasco's Residence

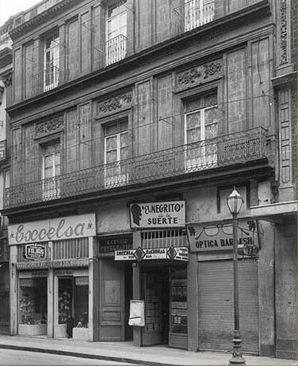
Facade of Count Guadalupe del Peñasco's Residence

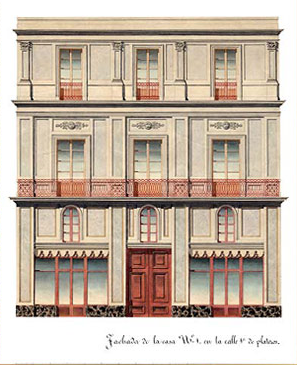
Exterior Architectural Perspective of Count Guadalupe del Peñasco's Residence

== External References ==
- "Condado de Guadalupe del Peñasco"
- "Family Papers of José Mariano Sánchez y Mora, Third Conde de Peñasco, 1699-1888"
- Grandes casas de Mexico
- ¿Qué pasó ahí?... Museo Mexicano del Diseño
- El reino de Nueva España en el Registro de la Real Estampilla
- Boletín Oficial del Estado
- Carta del conde del Peñasco al capitán don Juan N. Oviedo
- Títulos Nobiliarios concedidos en México
- Madero y la piel del leopardo
- Diputación Permanente y Consejo del la Grandeza de España
- Real Academia Matritense de Heráldica y Genealogía
- “Las Lumbreras” obra hidráulica del siglo XIX
- Rodríguez Alconedo, un hombre con capacidad para comprender el arte: Castro
- Hacienda de Bocas
- La participación del marqués Jaral de Berrio en la Independencia
- Blasones Hispanos
- De Medio Cuerpo Entero Editorial Vanguardia
- Títulos Nobiliarios de España
- Casa de Acequia
- La guerra de Independencia. La presencia de Calleja. Insurgentes y realistas
- Los secretos arquitectónicos de la ciudad, antes de convertirse en museos
- Las Lumbreras
