= Naro, Solomon Islands =

Naro
- Village
- Location in Guadalcanal
- Coordinates: 9°16′23″S 159°39′12″E
- Country: Solomon Islands
- Province: Guadalcanal
- Island: Guadalcanal
- Time zone: UTC+11 (UTC)

Naro is a village to the south of Veranaaso on the northwest coast of Guadalcanal, Solomon Islands. It is located 51.1 kilometres (31.8 mi) by road northwest of Honiara. The population is predominantly Roman Catholic.
