= Narro =

Narro can refer to:

- House of Narro, a Spanish noble lineage
- Jesús Narro Sancho (1922–1987), Spanish footballer
- José Narro Céspedes (born 1959), Mexican politician
- José Narro Robles (born 1948), Mexican academic and politician
- Manuel Acuña Narro (1849–1873), Mexican writer
- Pascual Marquina Narro (1873–1948), Spanish orchestral and operatic composer
- Víctor Narro (born 1999), Spanish footballer

== See also ==
- Naro (disambiguation)
- Narros (disambiguation)
- Narrow (disambiguation)
