= Japanese ship Nara =

Several ships have been named Nara (楢 / なら, "oak") :

- Japanese destroyer Nara (1918), the lead ship of her class of the Imperial Japanese Navy; renamed W-9 and re-rated as a minesweeper in June 1930; demilitarized in November 1940
- Japanese destroyer Nara (1944), a Matsu-class destroyer of the Imperial Japanese Navy during World War II
- JDS Nara (PF-2, PF-282), a Kusu-class patrol frigate of the Japan Maritime Self-Defense Force, formerly USS Machias (PF-53)

== See also ==
- Nara (disambiguation)
