= Juan Díaz Covarrubias =

Mexican writer and poet

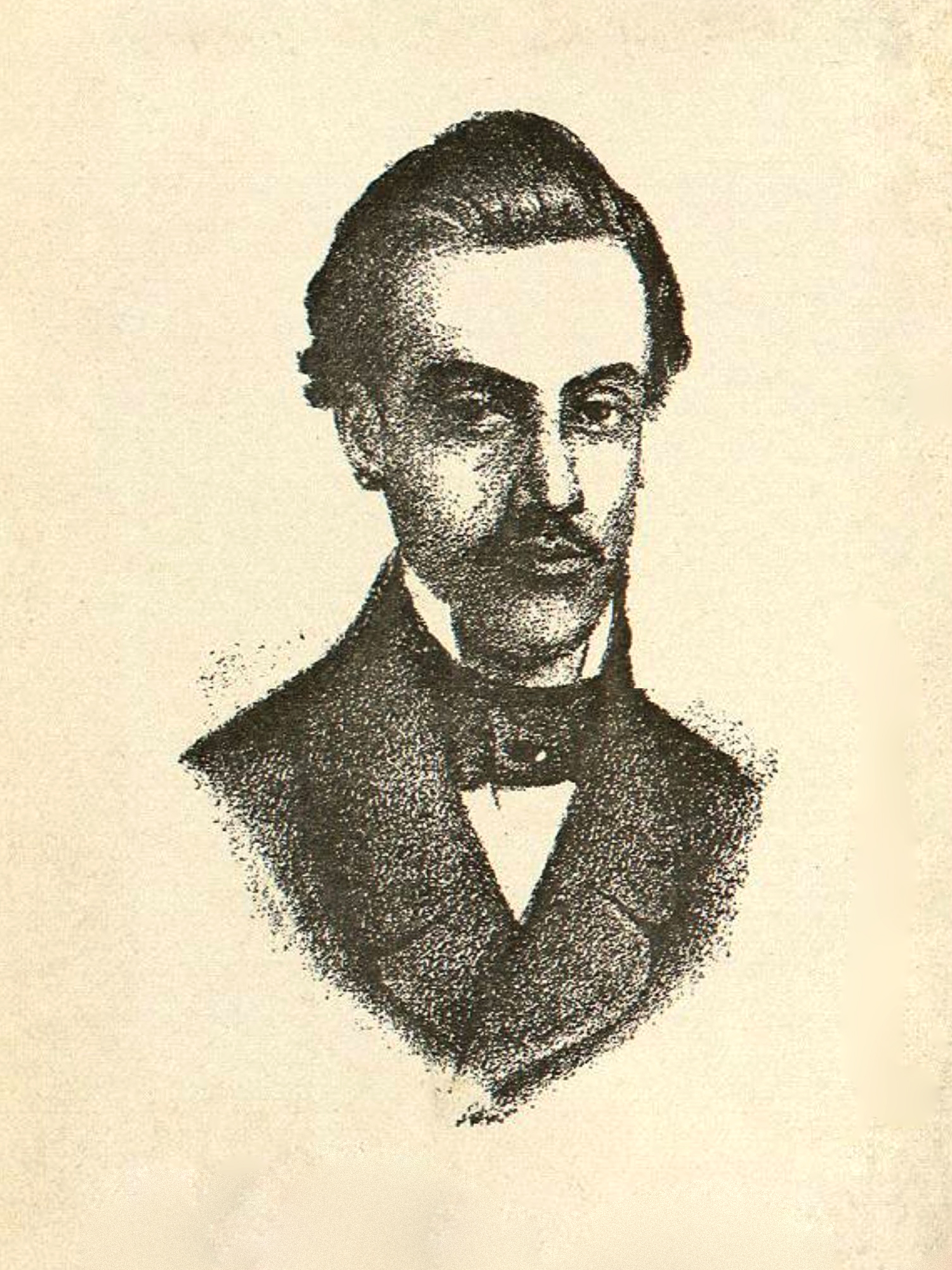
- (Xalapa, 1837 – Mexico City, 1859).
- Born: 27 December 1837; Xalapa, Veracruz, Mexico
- Died: 11 April 1859 (Aged 22); Mexico City, Mexico
- Occupations: Poet, politician
- Writing career
- Period: Romanticism

Signature
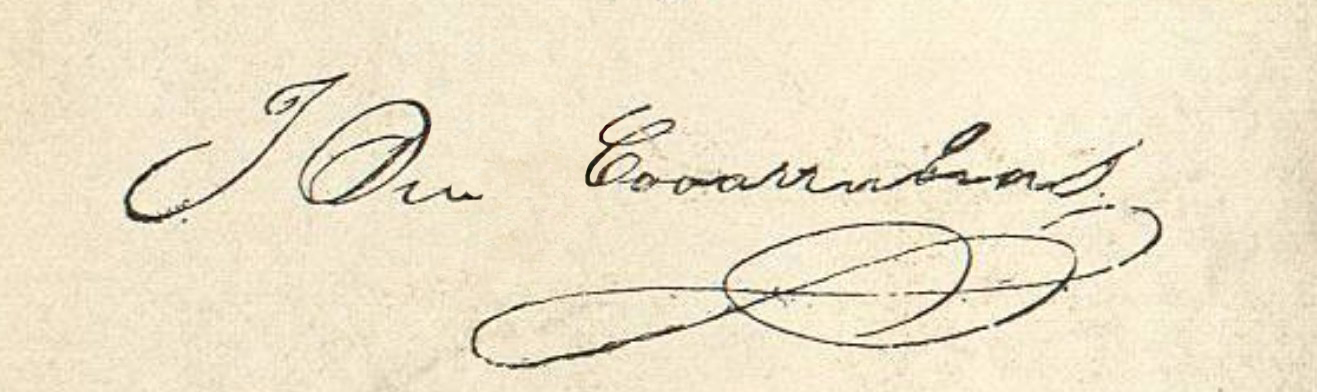

Juan Díaz Covarrubias (27 December 1837 – 11 April 1859) was a Mexican writer and poet of liberal ideology. He was one of the Martyrs of Tacubaya who were executed during the Reform War in Mexico.

== Biography ==
Diaz Covarrubias was born in Xalapa, Veracruz, on 27 December 1837. His father, the poet José de Jesús Díaz, had an artistic influence on him, since it was customary to hold tertulias at the home. In 1848 he moved with his family to Mexico City and enrolled in the San Juan de Letrán school to study philosophy and Latin. He became friends with law student Manuel Mateos — the brother of Juan Antonio Mateos — and Ignacio Manuel Altamirano. He also was a pupil of Ignacio Ramírez "El Nigromante".

Despite his great interest in literature and poetry, in 1852 Díaz Covarrubias began to study for a career in medicine. He joined the Liberal Party and simultaneously published articles and poems in the newspapers El Monitor Republicano, El Siglo Diez y Nueve and the Diario de Avisos.

In 1859, hearing rumours of the imminent clash between liberal and conservative troops in Tacubaya, he went there to offer his medical services to the troops of Santos Degollado. The battle of Tacubaya resulted to be a victory for the conservative army commanded by Leonardo Márquez. After the battle General Miguel Miramón ordered the Liberal officials who had been apprehended to be executed. In an excess committed by the Márquez's soldiers, in addition to officials and soldiers, doctors and civilians were executed. Covarrubias and his friend Mateos died at the paredón (execution wall) in Tacubaya, Mexico City, on 11 April 1859. The shooting of Díaz Covarrubias and the other Martyrs of Tacubaya was strongly criticized by Francisco Zarco in El Siglo Diez y Nueve. Manuel Acuña called Diaz Covarrubias "the Poet Martyr".

The town of San Juan Sugar in Hueyapan de Ocampo, Veracruz, was re-named Juan Díaz Covarrubias in his honour on 20 May 1938. Chalco de Díaz Covarrubias, the municipal seat of the surrounding municipality of Chalco in the State of Mexico, also added the poet's surname to its name, as a tribute to his work.

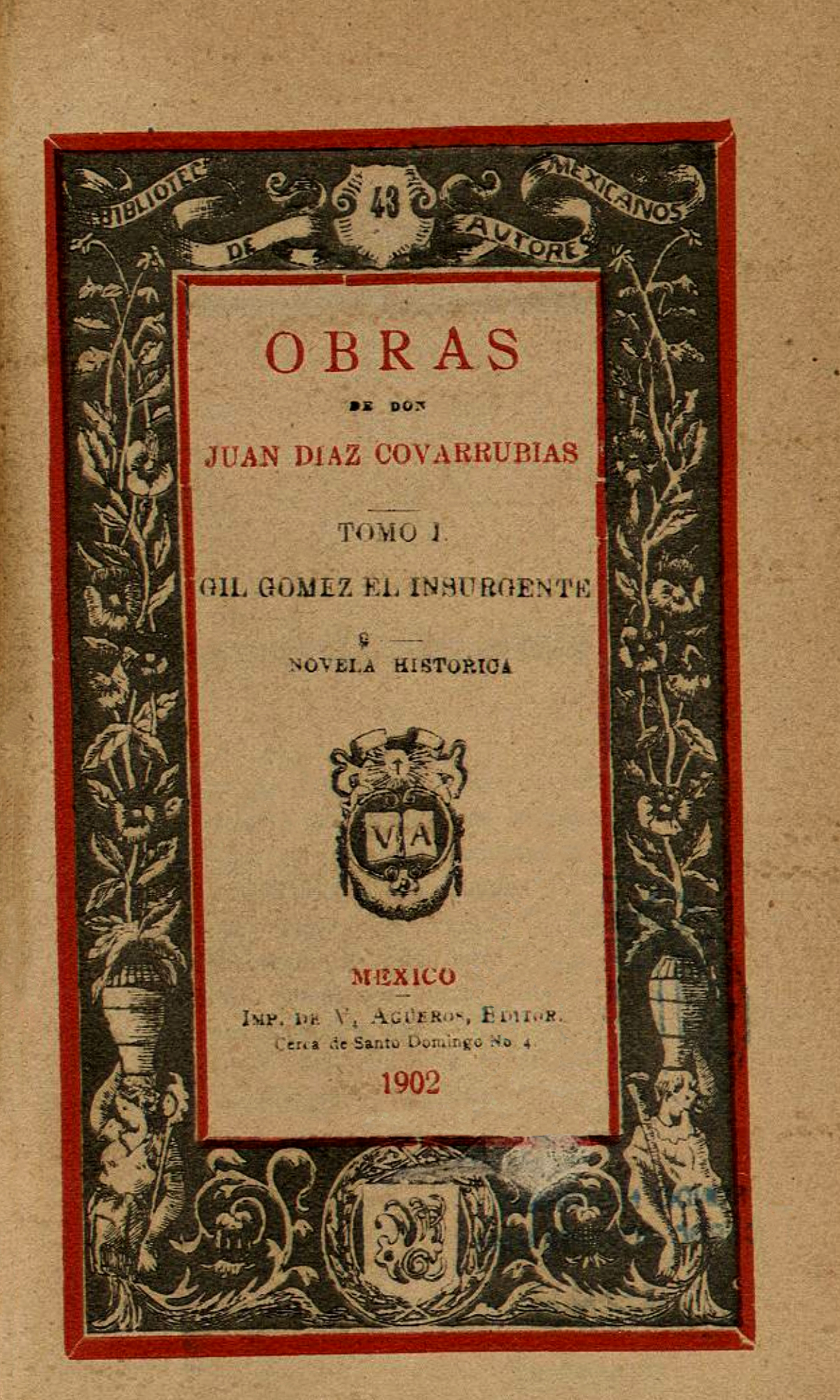
Cover of the book Works of Juan Díaz Covarrubias, 1902.

== Works ==
He belonged to the romanticism movement and is considered one of the pioneers of the Mexican historical novel. In his short life, he wrote numerous poems, several short stores and three novels:

- Gil Gómez el insurgente (Gil Gómez the Insurgent)
- La clase media (The Half Class)
- El diablo en México (The Devil in Mexico)
- La azucena y la violeta (The Lily and the Violet)
- La sensitiva (The Sensitive Girl)
- Episodio juvenil (Juvenile Episode)

In 1959, on the centenary of his death, the historian Clementina Díaz y de Ovando compiled his Complete Works.

== See also ==
- es:Mártires de Tacubaya
