= Narrows Bridge =

Narrows Bridge may refer to:

- Narrows Bridge (Perth), Western Australia
- Narrows Bridge (Indiana), USA
- Narrows Bridge (Pennsylvania), USA, listed on the National Register of Historic Places as Bridge in Snake Spring Township
- Narrows Bridge, Tamahere, New Zealand – heritage-registered bridge on State Highway 21

== See also ==
- Tacoma Narrows Bridge, pair of suspension bridges in Tacoma, Washington, USA
  - Tacoma Narrows Bridge (1940), the first suspension bridge in Tacoma, Washington, USA, whose collapse was caught on film in 1940
- Verrazzano–Narrows Bridge, in New York City
