= Nara, Attock =

Nara
- Union Council
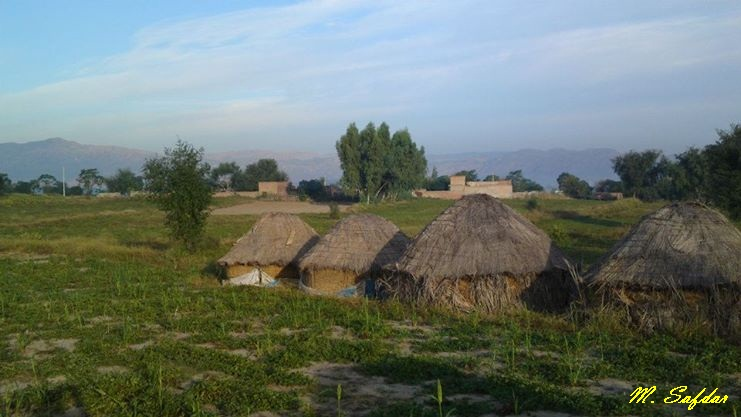
- Rural landscape of Village

- Location within Pakistan
- Coordinates: 33°38′20″N 72°3′11″E
- Country: Pakistan
- Province: Punjab
- District: Attock
- Tehsil: Jand
- Time zone: UTC+5 (PST)

Narrah ناڑا) is a village and union council of Jand Tehsil in Attock District of Punjab Province, Pakistan. The village is 117 kilometers from the country's capital, Islamabad.

Narrah is five kilometres away from the Indus River (دریائے سندھ) on the border between the Punjab and Khyber Pakhtunkhwa provinces of Pakistan.

== Gallery ==
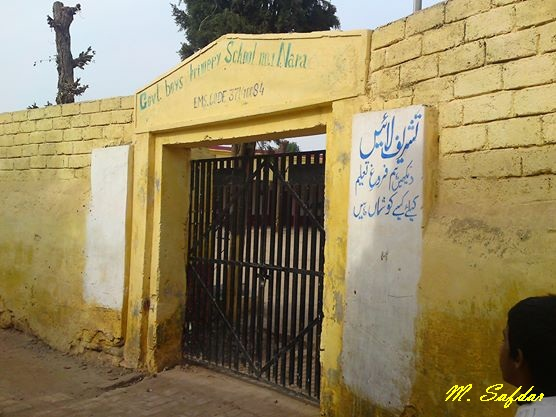
Ruins of old Government Primary School

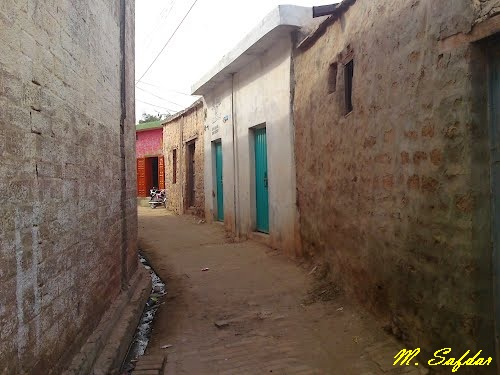
Old Streets of Nara 1

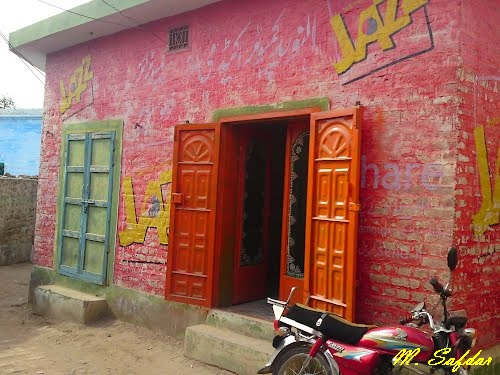
Old Streets of Nara 2

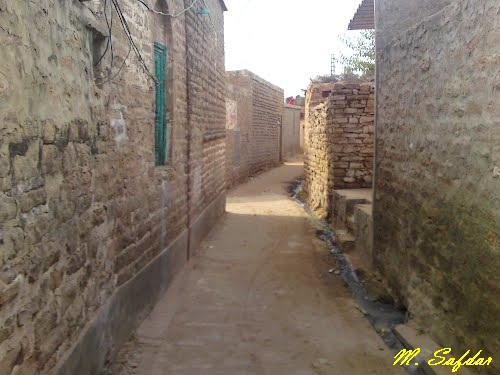
Old Streets of Nara 3

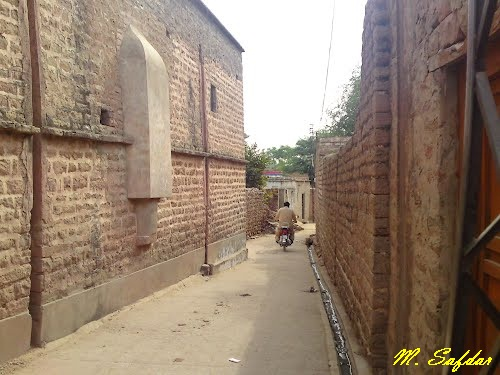
Old Streets of Nara 4

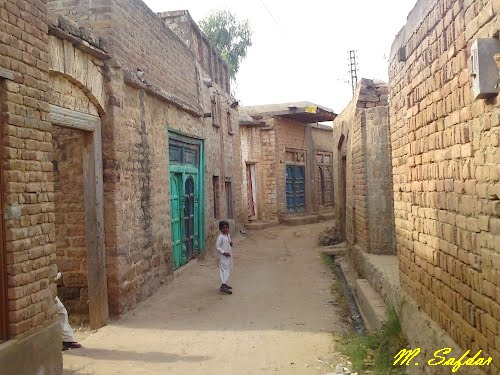
Old Streets of Nara 5
