= Badarán =

- Municipality
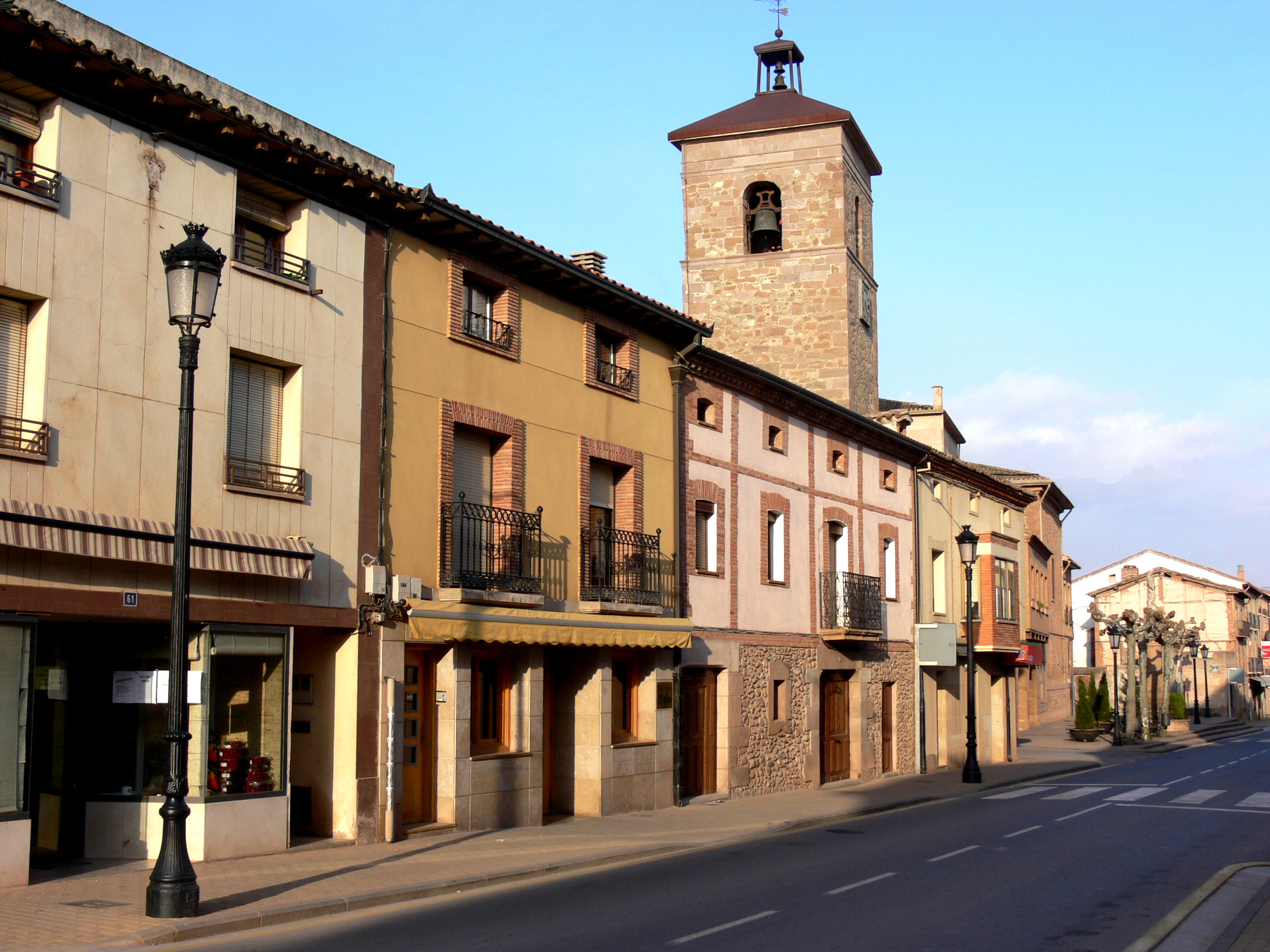
- Badarán's town centre

- Coat of arms

- Location within La Rioja, Spain Location within Spain
- Coordinates: 42°22′1″N 2°48′27″W
- Country: Spain
- Autonomous community: La Rioja
- Province: La Rioja
- Region: Rioja Alta
- Comarca: Nájera

Government
  - Mayor: Francisco Javier Ibáñez Rodríguez (PSOE)

Area
  - Total: 20.69 km^{2} (7.99 sq mi)
- Elevation: 623 m (2,044 ft)

Population (2025-01-01)
  - Total: 474
- Postal code: 26310
- Website: City Council

Badarán is a village in the province and autonomous community of La Rioja, Spain. The municipality covers an area of 20.69 square kilometres (7.99 sq mi) and as of 2011 had a population of 595 people.

== History ==
Prehistoric remains have been found within the municipal area of Badarán showing the existence of people in the area during the Palaeolithic period. There were also later settlements in Roman times.

The town was founded on the road that linked the Monastery of San Millán de la Cogolla, with Nájera. The name of the nucleus is Basque in origin and is composed of two very identifiable words, according to Basque analysts, bad ('one or first') and Aran ('valley'), being defined as 'the first in the valley', referring to the location of the village in the River Cardenas valley.

The first written document in which it appears is a deed of gift of the location to the Monastery of San Millán in the tenth century. There were three villages near Badarán called Villagonzalo, Terrero and Villorquite. On 15 May 1326 the four locations merged to form the current municipality of Badarán. The Privilege of the Union was requested by the Abbot of San Millán, Diego Lopez, from King Alfonso XI of Castile, who granted it in Burgos.

== Population ==
In 2010 the population increased to 626 inhabitants, 330 men and 296 women.

demographic vertical bar chart of between 1857 and 2010
Legal population (1857-1897) according to the population census published by the Instituto Nacional de Estadística in the 19th century.
Legal population (1900-1991) or Resident population (2001) according to the population census published by the Instituto Nacional de Estadística.
Population according to the municipal register of 2010 published by the Instituto Nacional de Estadística.

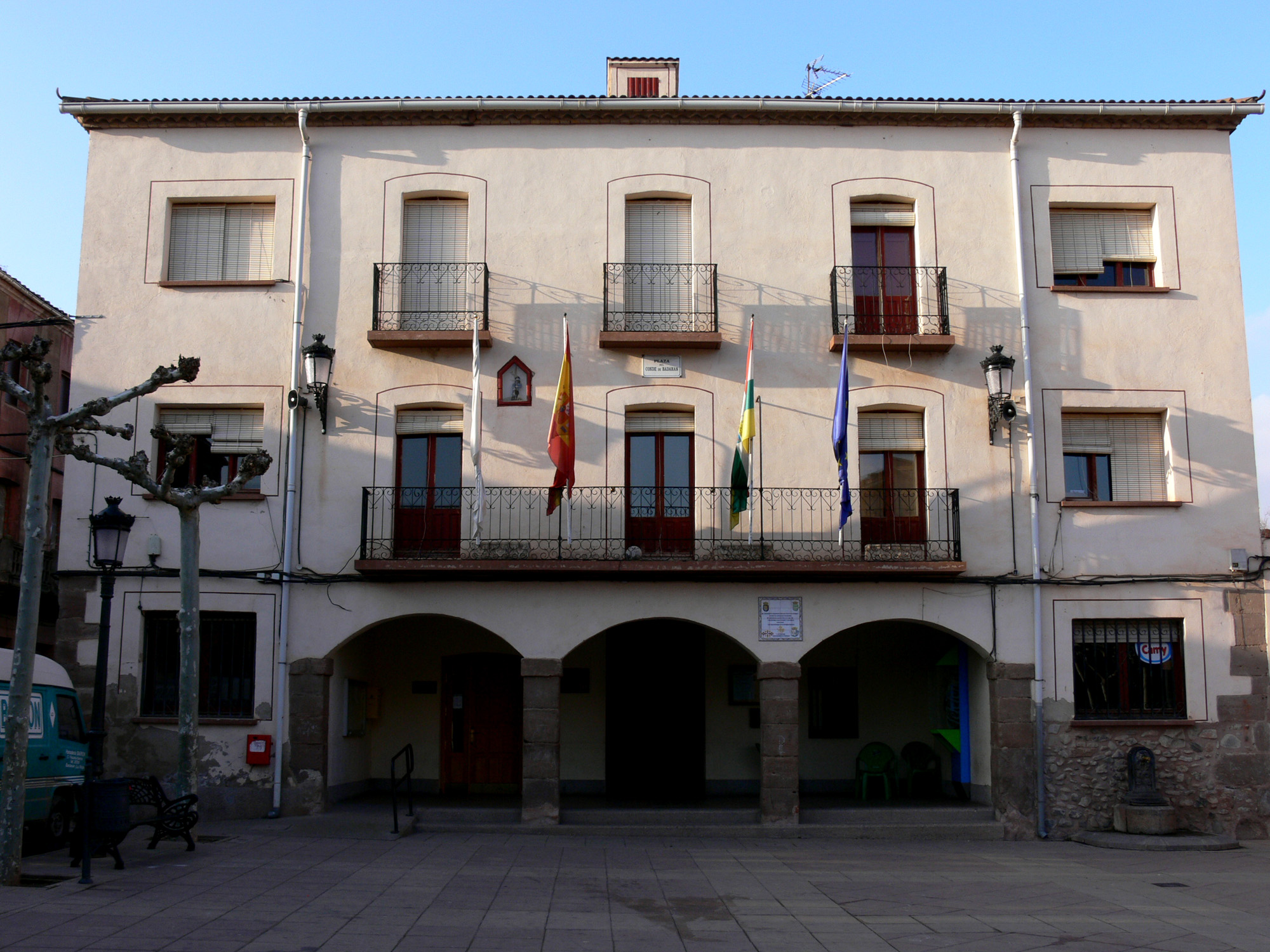
Badarán City Council.
