= Motional narrowing =

In physics and chemistry, motional narrowing is a phenomenon where a certain resonant frequency has a smaller linewidth than might be expected, due to motion in an inhomogeneous system. The discovery of motional narrowing has been attributed to Nicolaas Bloembergen during his thesis work in the 1940s

== Example: NMR spectroscopy ==
A common example is NMR. In this process, the nuclear spin of an atom starts rotating, with the frequency of rotation proportional to the external magnetic field that the atom experiences. However, in an inhomogeneous medium, the magnetic field often varies from point to point (depending, for example, on the magnetic susceptibility of nearby atoms), so the frequency of nuclear spin rotation is different in different places. Therefore, when detecting the resonant rotation frequency, there is a linewidth (i.e., finite range of different frequencies) due to the variation in that resonant frequency from point to point. (This is called "inhomogeneous broadening".)

However, if the atoms are diffusing around the system, they will experience a higher magnetic field than average sometimes, and a lower magnetic field than average other times. Therefore, (in accordance with the central limit theorem), the time-averaged magnetic field experienced by an atom has less variation than the instantaneous magnetic field does. As a consequence, when detecting the resonant rotation frequency, the linewidth is smaller (narrower) than it would be if the atoms were stationary. This is the motional narrowing effect.

== Example: Electron spins in magnetically doped semiconductors ==
In magnetically doped semiconductors, the local magnetic field is determined by the magnetization of the dopant ions which are distributed statistically. The spin of charge carriers precesses in this field. The motional character enters the picture by the fact that the charge carriers diffuse through the semiconductor, and that the electron and hole spins thereby experience a varying local magnetization and variations of spin precession. The motional-narrowing effect was studied in optical pump/probe experiments, where mobile singlet excitons were excited optically. The motional narrowing manifests in a peculiar temperature dependence of spin dephasing: The dephasing becomes slower at higher sample temperature where the exciton velocity becomes larger and the excitons more quickly experience environments with different magnetization.

== Example: Vibrational spectroscopy ==
A similar phenomenon occurs in many other systems. Another example is vibrational modes in a liquid. Each molecule of the liquid has vibrational modes, and the vibrational frequency is influenced by the positions of nearby molecules. However, if the nearby molecules reorient and move around fast enough, the vibration will essentially occur at an averaged frequency, and therefore have a smaller linewidth. For example, simulations suggest that the OH stretch vibration linewidth in liquid water is 30% smaller than it would be without this motional narrowing effect.

== See also ==
- Dicke effect
