= Spectral line =

Distinctive narrow spectral feature of chemical species

Continuous spectrum

Emission lines (discrete spectrum)

Absorption spectrum with absorption lines

A spectral line is a weaker or stronger region in an otherwise uniform and continuous spectrum. It may result from emission or absorption of light in a narrow frequency range, compared with the nearby frequencies. Spectral lines are often used to identify atoms and molecules. These "fingerprints" can be compared to the previously collected ones of atoms and molecules, and are thus used to identify the atomic and molecular components of stars and planets, which would otherwise be impossible.

== Types of line spectra ==
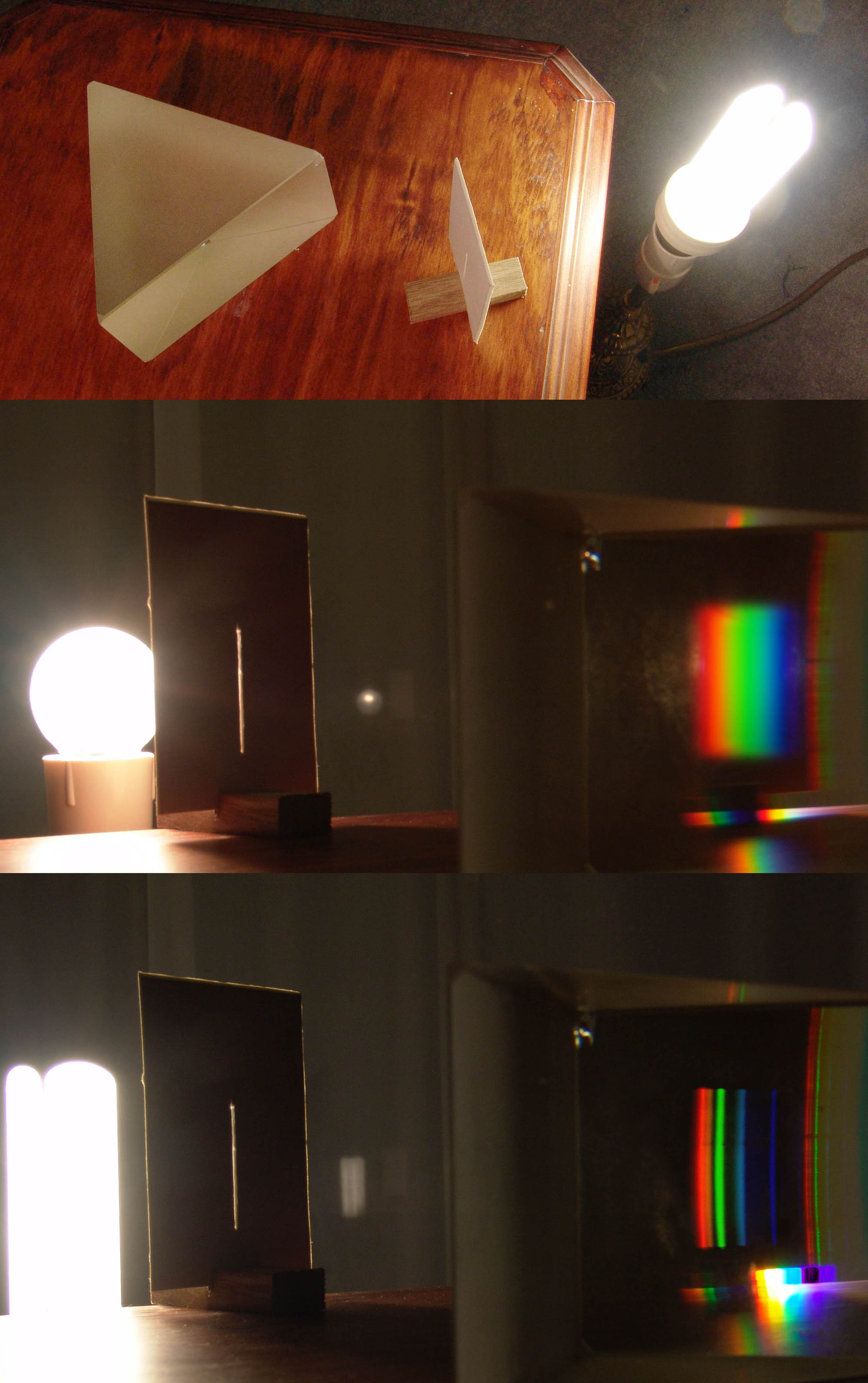
Continuous spectrum of an incandescent lamp (mid) and discrete spectrum lines of a fluorescent lamp (bottom)

Spectral lines are the result of interaction between a quantum system (usually atoms, but sometimes molecules or atomic nuclei) and a single photon. When a photon has about the right amount of energy (which is connected to its frequency) to allow a change in the energy state of the system (in the case of an atom this is usually an electron changing orbitals), the photon is absorbed. Then the energy will be spontaneously re-emitted, either as one photon at the same frequency as the original one or in a cascade, where the sum of the energies of the photons emitted will be equal to the energy of the one absorbed (assuming the system returns to its original state).

A spectral line may be observed either as an emission line or an absorption line. Which type of line is observed depends on the type of material and its temperature relative to another emission source. An absorption line is produced when photons from a hot, broad spectrum source pass through a cooler material. The intensity of light, over a narrow frequency range, is reduced due to absorption by the material and re-emission in random directions. By contrast, a bright emission line is produced when photons from a hot material are detected, perhaps in the presence of a broad spectrum from a cooler source. The intensity of light, over a narrow frequency range, is increased due to emission by the hot material.

Spectral lines are highly atom-specific, and can be used to identify the chemical composition of any medium. Several elements, including helium, thallium, and caesium, were discovered by spectroscopic means. Spectral lines also depend on the temperature and density of the material, so they are widely used to determine the physical composition and condition of distant stars and other celestial bodies. Some of these data cannot be obtained or analyzed by other means, and so the field of spectroscopy has grown as astronomical and telescopic exploration has grown.

Depending on the material and its physical conditions, the energy of the involved photons can vary widely, with the spectral lines observed across the electromagnetic spectrum, from radio waves to gamma rays.

== Nomenclature ==
Strong spectral lines in the visible part of the electromagnetic spectrum often have a unique Fraunhofer line designation, such as K for a line at 393.366 nm emerging from singly-ionized calcium atom, Ca^{+}, though some of the Fraunhofer "lines" are blends of multiple lines from several different species.

In other cases, the lines are designated according to the level of ionization by adding a Roman numeral to the designation of the chemical element. Neutral atoms are denoted with the Roman numeral I, singly ionized atoms with II, and so on, so that, for example:

Cu II — copper ion with +1 charge, Cu^{1+}

Fe III — iron ion with +2 charge, Fe^{2+}

More detailed designations usually include the line wavelength and may include a multiplet number (for atomic lines) or band designation (for molecular lines). Many spectral lines of atomic hydrogen also have designations within their respective series, such as the Lyman series or Balmer series. Originally all spectral lines were classified into series: the principal series, sharp series, and diffuse series. These series exist across atoms of all elements, and the patterns for all atoms are well-predicted by the Rydberg-Ritz formula. These series were later associated with suborbitals.

== Line broadening and shift ==
There are a number of effects which control spectral line shape. A spectral line extends over a tiny spectral band with a nonzero range of frequencies, not a single frequency (i.e., a nonzero spectral width). In addition, its center may be shifted from its nominal central wavelength. There are several reasons for this broadening and shift. These reasons may be divided into two general categories – broadening due to local conditions and broadening due to extended conditions. Broadening due to local conditions is due to effects which hold in a small region around the emitting element, usually small enough to assure local thermodynamic equilibrium. Broadening due to extended conditions may result from changes to the spectral distribution of the radiation as it traverses its path to the observer. It also may result from the combining of radiation from a number of regions which are far from each other.

=== Broadening due to local effects ===
==== Natural broadening ====
The lifetime of excited states results in natural broadening, also known as lifetime broadening. The uncertainty principle relates the lifetime of an excited state (due to spontaneous radiative decay or the Auger process) with the uncertainty of its energy. Some authors use the term "radiative broadening" to refer specifically to the part of natural broadening caused by the spontaneous radiative decay. A short lifetime will have a large energy uncertainty and a broad emission. This broadening effect results in an unshifted Lorentzian profile. The natural broadening can be experimentally altered only to the extent that decay rates can be artificially suppressed or enhanced.

==== Thermal Doppler broadening ====
The atoms in a gas which are emitting radiation will have a distribution of velocities. Each photon emitted will be "red"- or "blue"-shifted by the Doppler effect depending on the velocity of the atom relative to the observer. The higher the temperature of the gas, the wider the distribution of velocities in the gas. Since the spectral line is a combination of all of the emitted radiation, the higher the temperature of the gas, the broader the spectral line emitted from that gas. This broadening effect is described by a Gaussian profile and there is no associated shift.

==== Pressure broadening ====
The presence of nearby particles will affect the radiation emitted by an individual particle. There are two limiting cases by which this occurs:

- Impact pressure broadening or collisional broadening: The collision of other particles with the light emitting particle interrupts the emission process, and by shortening the characteristic time for the process, increases the uncertainty in the energy emitted (as occurs in natural broadening). The duration of the collision is much shorter than the lifetime of the emission process. This effect depends on both the density and the temperature of the gas. The broadening effect is described by a Lorentzian profile and there may be an associated shift.
- Quasistatic pressure broadening: The presence of other particles shifts the energy levels in the emitting particle (see spectral band), thereby altering the frequency of the emitted radiation. The duration of the influence is much longer than the lifetime of the emission process. This effect depends on the density of the gas, but is rather insensitive to temperature. The form of the line profile is determined by the functional form of the perturbing force with respect to distance from the perturbing particle. There may also be a shift in the line center. The general expression for the lineshape resulting from quasistatic pressure broadening is a 4-parameter generalization of the Gaussian distribution known as a stable distribution.

Pressure broadening may also be classified by the nature of the perturbing force as follows:

- Linear Stark broadening occurs via the linear Stark effect, which results from the interaction of an emitter with an electric field of a charged particle at a distance $r$, causing a shift in energy that is linear in the field strength. $(\Delta E \sim 1/r^2)$
- Resonance broadening occurs when the perturbing particle is of the same type as the emitting particle, which introduces the possibility of an energy exchange process. $(\Delta E \sim 1/r^3)$
- Quadratic Stark broadening occurs via the quadratic Stark effect, which results from the interaction of an emitter with an electric field, causing a shift in energy that is quadratic in the field strength. $(\Delta E \sim 1/r^4)$
- Van der Waals broadening occurs when the emitting particle is being perturbed by Van der Waals forces. For the quasistatic case, a Van der Waals profile (Note: "Van der Waals profile" appears as lowercase in almost all sources) is often useful in describing the profile. The energy shift as a function of distance between the interacting particles is given in the wings by e.g. the Lennard-Jones potential. $(\Delta E \sim 1/r^6)$

==== Inhomogeneous broadening ====
Inhomogeneous broadening is a general term for broadening because some emitting particles are in a different local environment from others, and therefore emit at a different frequency. This term is used especially for solids, where surfaces, grain boundaries, and stoichiometry variations can create a variety of local environments for a given atom to occupy. In liquids, the effects of inhomogeneous broadening is sometimes reduced by a process called motional narrowing.

=== Broadening due to non-local effects ===
Certain types of broadening are the result of conditions over a large region of space rather than simply upon conditions that are local to the emitting particle.

==== Opacity broadening ====
Opacity broadening is an example of a non-local broadening mechanism. Electromagnetic radiation emitted at a particular point in space can be reabsorbed as it travels through space. This absorption depends on wavelength. The line is broadened because the photons at the line center have a greater reabsorption probability than the photons at the line wings. Indeed, the reabsorption near the line center may be so great as to cause a self reversal in which the intensity at the center of the line is less than in the wings. This process is also sometimes called self-absorption.

==== Macroscopic Doppler broadening ====
Radiation emitted by a moving source is subject to Doppler shift due to a finite line-of-sight velocity projection. If different parts of the emitting body have different velocities (along the line of sight), the resulting line will be broadened, with the line width proportional to the width of the velocity distribution. For example, radiation emitted from a distant rotating body, such as a star, will be broadened due to the line-of-sight variations in velocity on opposite sides of the star (this effect usually referred to as rotational broadening). The greater the rate of rotation, the broader the line. Another example is an imploding plasma shell in a Z-pinch.

=== Combined effects ===
Each of these mechanisms can act in isolation or in combination with others. Assuming each effect is independent, the observed line profile is a convolution of the line profiles of each mechanism. For example, a combination of the thermal Doppler broadening and the impact pressure broadening yields a Voigt profile.

However, the different line broadening mechanisms are not always independent. For example, the collisional effects and the motional Doppler shifts can act in a coherent manner, resulting under some conditions even in a collisional narrowing, known as the Dicke effect.

== Spectral lines of chemical elements ==
Absorption lines for air, under indirect illumination, so that the gas is not directly between source and detector. Here, Fraunhofer lines in sunlight and Rayleigh scattering of this sunlight is the "source." This is the spectrum of a blue sky somewhat close to the horizon, looking east with the sun to the west at around 3–4 pm on a clear day.

=== Bands ===
The phrase "spectral lines", when not qualified, usually refers to lines having wavelengths in the visible band of the full electromagnetic spectrum. Many spectral lines occur at wavelengths outside this range. At shorter wavelengths, which correspond to higher energies, ultraviolet spectral lines include the Lyman series of hydrogen. At the much shorter wavelengths of X-rays, the lines are known as characteristic X-rays because they remain largely unchanged for a given chemical element, independent of their chemical environment. Longer wavelengths correspond to lower energies, where the infrared spectral lines include the Paschen series of hydrogen. At even longer wavelengths, the radio spectrum includes the 21-cm line used to detect neutral hydrogen throughout the cosmos.

=== Visible light ===
For each element, the following table shows the spectral lines which appear in the visible spectrum at 380-780 nm.

Spectral lines of the chemical elements
Element	Z	Symbol	Spectral lines
hydrogen	1	H	Spectra of H
helium	2	He	Spectra of He
lithium	3	Li	Spectra of Li
beryllium	4	Be	Spectra of Be
boron	5	B	Spectra of B
carbon	6	C	Spectra of C
nitrogen	7	N	Spectra of N
oxygen	8	O	Spectra of O
fluorine	9	F	Spectra of F
neon	10	Ne	Spectra of Ne
sodium	11	Na	Spectra of Na
magnesium	12	Mg	Spectra of Mg
aluminium	13	Al	Spectra of Al
silicon	14	Si	Spectra of Si
phosphorus	15	P	Spectra of P
sulfur	16	S	Spectra of S
chlorine	17	Cl	Spectra of Cl
argon	18	Ar	Spectra of Ar
potassium	19	K	Spectra of K
calcium	20	Ca	Spectra of Ca
scandium	21	Sc	Spectra of Sc
titanium	22	Ti	Spectra of Ti
vanadium	23	V	Spectra of V
chromium	24	Cr	Spectra of Cr
manganese	25	Mn	Spectra of Mn
iron	26	Fe	Spectra of Fe
cobalt	27	Co	Spectra of Co
nickel	28	Ni	Spectra of Ni
copper	29	Cu	Spectra of Cu
zinc	30	Zn	Spectra of Zn
gallium	31	Ga	Spectra of Ga
germanium	32	Ge	Spectra of Ge
arsenic	33	As	Spectra of As
selenium	34	Se	Spectra of Se
bromine	35	Br	Spectra of Br
krypton	36	Kr	Spectra of Kr
rubidium	37	Rb	Spectra of Rb
strontium	38	Sr	Spectra of Sr
yttrium	39	Y	Spectra of Y
zirconium	40	Zr	Spectra of Zr
niobium	41	Nb	Spectra of Nb
molybdenum	42	Mo	Spectra of Mo
technetium	43	Tc	Spectra of Tc
ruthenium	44	Ru	Spectra of Ru
rhodium	45	Rh	Spectra of Rh
palladium	46	Pd	Spectra of Pd
silver	47	Ag	Spectra of Ag
cadmium	48	Cd	Spectra of Cd
indium	49	In	Spectra of In
tin	50	Sn	Spectra of Sn
antimony	51	Sb	Spectra of Sb
tellurium	52	Te	Spectra of Te
iodine	53	I	Spectra of I
xenon	54	Xe	Spectra of Xe
caesium	55	Cs	Spectra of Cs
barium	56	Ba	Spectra of Ba
lanthanum	57	La	Spectra of La
cerium	58	Ce	Spectra of Ce
praseodymium	59	Pr	Spectra of Pr
neodymium	60	Nd	Spectra of Nd
promethium	61	Pm	Spectra of Pm
samarium	62	Sm	Spectra of Sm
europium	63	Eu	Spectra of Eu
gadolinium	64	Gd	Spectra of Gd
terbium	65	Tb	Spectra of Tb
dysprosium	66	Dy	Spectra of Dy
holmium	67	Ho	Spectra of Ho
erbium	68	Er	Spectra of Er
thulium	69	Tm	Spectra of Tm
ytterbium	70	Yb	Spectra of Yb
lutetium	71	Lu	Spectra of Lu
hafnium	72	Hf	Spectra of Hf
tantalum	73	Ta	Spectra of Ta
tungsten	74	W	Spectra of W
rhenium	75	Re	Spectra of Re
osmium	76	Os	Spectra of Os
iridium	77	Ir	Spectra of Ir
platinum	78	Pt	Spectra of Pt
gold	79	Au	Spectra of Au
mercury	80	Hg	Spectra of Hg
thallium	81	Tl	Spectra of Tl
lead	82	Pb	Spectra of Pb
bismuth	83	Bi	Spectra of Bi
polonium	84	Po	Spectra of Po
astatine	85	At	
radon	86	Rn	Spectra of Rn
francium	87	Fr	
radium	88	Ra	Spectra of Ra
actinium	89	Ac	Spectra of Ac
thorium	90	Th	Spectra of Th
protactinium	91	Pa	Spectra of Pa
uranium	92	U	Spectra of U
neptunium	93	Np	Spectra of Np
plutonium	94	Pu	Spectra of Pu
americium	95	Am	Spectra of Am
curium	96	Cm	Spectra of Cm
berkelium	97	Bk	Spectra of Bk
californium	98	Cf	Spectra of Cf
einsteinium	99	Es	Spectra of Es
fermium–oganesson	100–118	Fm–Og	

== See also ==
- Absorption spectrum
- Atomic spectral line
- Bohr model
- Electron configuration
- Emission spectrum
- Fourier transform
- Fraunhofer line
- Table of emission spectra of gas discharge lamps
- Hydrogen line (21-cm line)
- Hydrogen spectral series
- Spectral band
- Spectroscopy
- Splatalogue
