= Naro Moru river =

River in Kenya

The Naro Moru River starts on Mount Kenya and flows down to the west, through Nyeri County, Kenya, into the Ewaso Ng'iro River. The North and South Naro Moru Rivers are fed by the Teleki Tarn, Lewis Glacier, Tyndall Tarn and Glacier, Hut Tarn and Darwin Glacier at the peaks of Mount Kenya. They join at 2,810 m (9,200 ft) above sea level. The Naro Moru River flows for around 50 km (31 mi), through Naro Moru town, until it reaches the Ewaso Ngiro River. The catchment area of the Naro Moru River is around 83 km^{2}.
