= Dicke effect =

Phenomenon in spectroscopy

In spectroscopy, the Dicke effect, also known as Dicke narrowing or sometimes collisional narrowing, named after Robert H. Dicke, refers to narrowing of the Doppler broadening of a spectral line due to collisions the emitting species (usually an atom or a molecule) experiences with other particles.

== Mechanism ==
When the mean free path of an atom is much smaller than the wavelength of the radiative transition, the atom changes velocity and direction many times during the emission or absorption of a photon. This causes an averaging over different Doppler states and results in an atomic linewidth that is narrower than the Doppler width.

== See also ==
- Mössbauer effect
- Motional narrowing
- Stark effect
- Zeeman effect
