= Javier Santamaría =

Spanish politician (1951–2020)

Javier Vicente Santamaría Herranz (5 April 1951 – 13 April 2020) was a Spanish People's Party (PP) politician, president of the province of Segovia between 2003 and 2011 and member of the Senate between 2011 and 2015.

== Biography and career ==
Javier Santamaría was born in Abades, province of Segovia on 5 April 1951 the son of two local school teachers. His political career began in 1991 when he was elected mayor of his hometown for the PP, office he held until 1996 to take charge of the Territorial Delegation of the Junta of Castile and León. He had previously worked as a Maths teacher at the IES Giner de los Ríos in Segovia.

In 2003 he was elected president of the Segovia Provincial Deputation, and until 2011, when he returned to teach Maths at the same school he had left 15 years earlier. That same year he was elected senator for the Segovia constituency in the general election and retired from politics when in the 2015 elections he no longer repeated the office.

On 15 November 2013, the Court of Instruction number 2 of Segovia, at the request of the prosecution, he was charged along with the other former members of the board of the Savings bank Caja Segovia for the case of millionaire compensation and early retirement of directors. In June 2016, the case was dismissed as the judge did not see any evidence of a crime.

== Personal life and death ==
He married Pilar, with whom she had two children, and had three grandchildren.

Santamaría was admitted to the Segovia health care complex on 19 March 2020, affected by COVID-19 during the pandemic in Spain. Afterwards he was transferred to the ICU in Valladolid, where he died a month later, on 13 April at the age of 69 after failing to overcome the disease.
