= Veranaaso =

- Village
- Location in Guadalcanal
- Coordinates: 9°16′23″S 159°39′12″E
- Country: Solomon Islands
- Province: Guadalcanal
- Island: Guadalcanal
- Time zone: UTC+11 (UTC)

Veranaaso is a large village on the northwest coast of Guadalcanal, Solomon Islands. It is located 49.5 kilometres (30.8 mi) by road northwest of Honiara.
