= Villar de Torre =

- Municipality
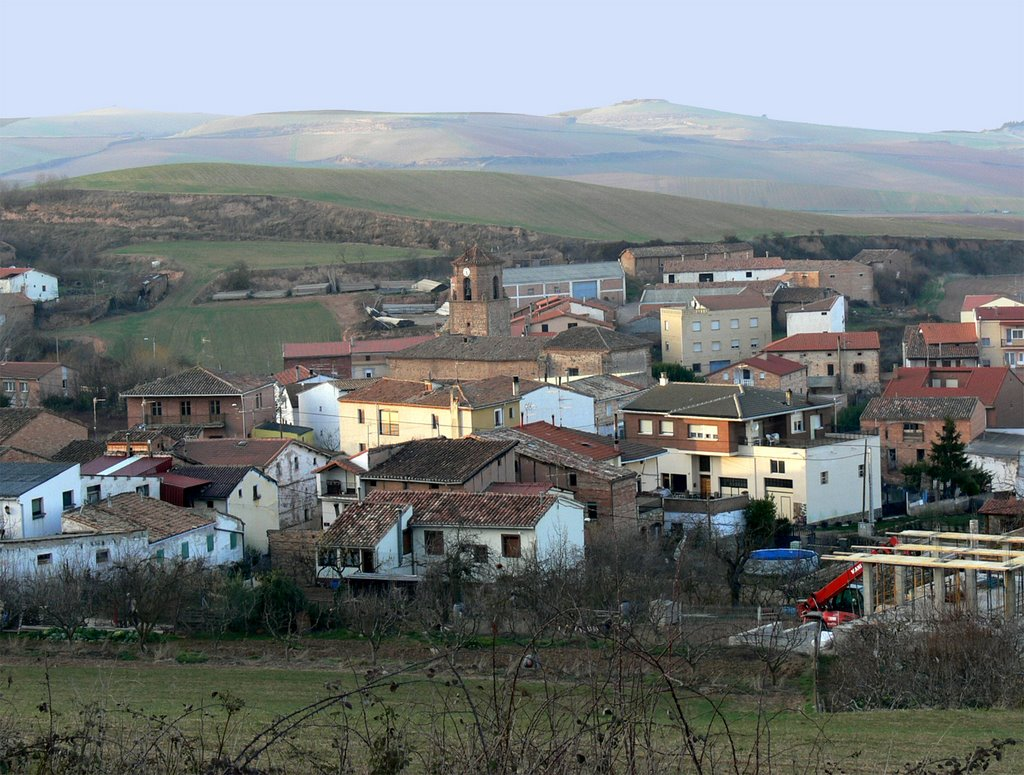
- Skyline of Villar de Torre

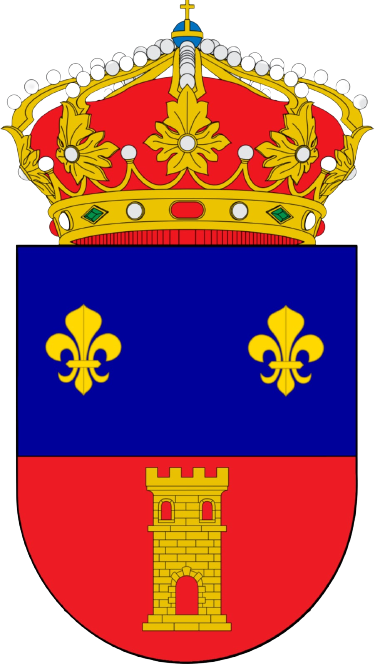
- Coat of arms

- Location within La Rioja, Spain Location within Spain
- Coordinates: 42°22′14″N 2°51′56″W
- Country: Spain
- Autonomous community: La Rioja
- Comarca: Nájera

Government
  - Mayor: José Pedro Espinosa (PP)

Area
  - Total: 11.99 km^{2} (4.63 sq mi)
- Elevation: 766 m (2,513 ft)

Population (2025-01-01)
  - Total: 143
- Postal code: 26325

Villar de Torre is a village in the province and autonomous community of La Rioja, Spain. The municipality covers an area of 11.99 square kilometres (4.63 sq mi) and as of 2011 had a population of 263 people.
