= Naro Moru =

Naro moru
- town
- Location within Kenya
- Coordinates: 0°10′S 37°01′E
- Country: Kenya
- County: Nyeri County

Population (1999)
  - Urban: 2,643
- Time zone: UTC+3 (EAT)

Naro Moru is a small market town in Nyeri County in central Kenya, lying on the Naromoru River, between Nyeri and Nanyuki. It is 21.8 km to Nanyuki town. Its main industry is tourism, as a base for hikers ascending Mount Kenya to its east. It has several hotels and holiday tour organizers that bring groups of tourists. Solio Game Reserve lies near the town. The town was previously the center of the former Kieni East District. According to the 1999 census, the urban population was 2,643). The Naromoru River flows through the town.

The town has an elevation of around 2200 metres and has a tropical savannah climate with a winter dry season. There are farms growing vegetables such as peas, chillies, and safflowers (which are pressed for oil), as well as the eucalyptus. Livestock farming includes cattle, chickens, and ostriches.

Naro Moru has several educational institutions, including girls' and boys' secondary schools, a Roman Catholic secondary school, and primary schools. There is also a home for children with disabilities (at Mung'etho shopping centre), and a private mixed primary school.
