= Neale Analysis of Reading Ability =

Assessment of comprehension and word reading accuracy

The Neale Analysis of Reading Ability (NARA) is a tool to assess reading comprehension and reading accuracy. It was invented by Marie D. Neale.
