= Narros del Castillo =

- municipality
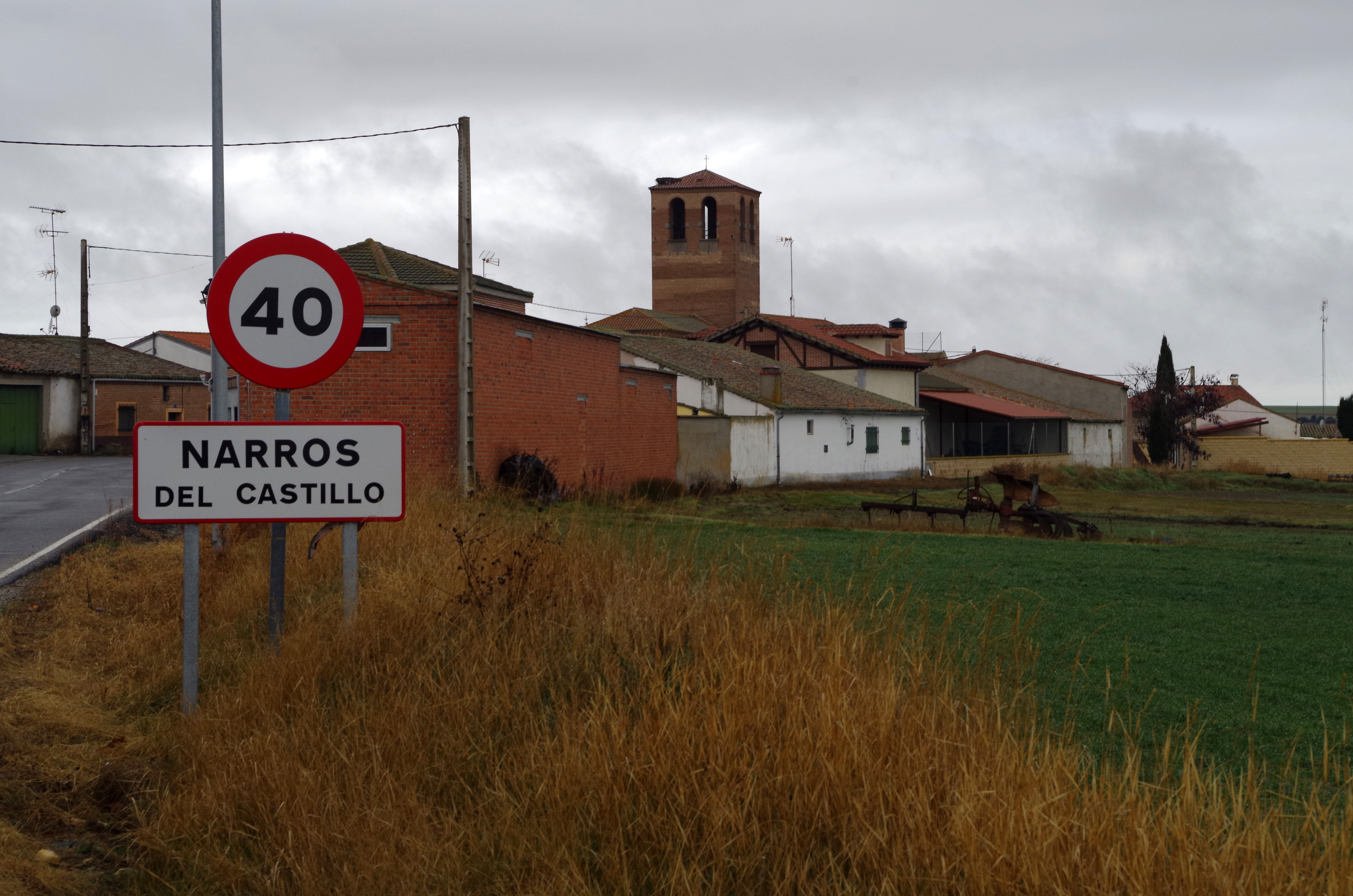
- Flag Coat of arms
- Location in Spain. Narros del Castillo (Spain)
- Coordinates: 40°51′31″N 5°03′31″W
- Country: Spain
- Autonomous community: Castile and León
- Province: Ávila
- Municipality: Narros del Castillo

Area
  - Total: 33 km^{2} (13 sq mi)

Population (2025-01-01)
  - Total: 151
  - Density: 4.6/km^{2} (12/sq mi)
- Time zone: UTC+1 (CET)
  - Summer (DST): UTC+2 (CEST)
- Website: Official website

Narros del Castillo is a municipality located in the province of Ávila, Castile and León, Spain.

== Population ==
Historical population
Year	Pop.	±% p.a.
2023	148	—
2024	152	+2.70%
2025	151	−0.66%
Source: INE
