= Narros de Saldueña =

- municipality
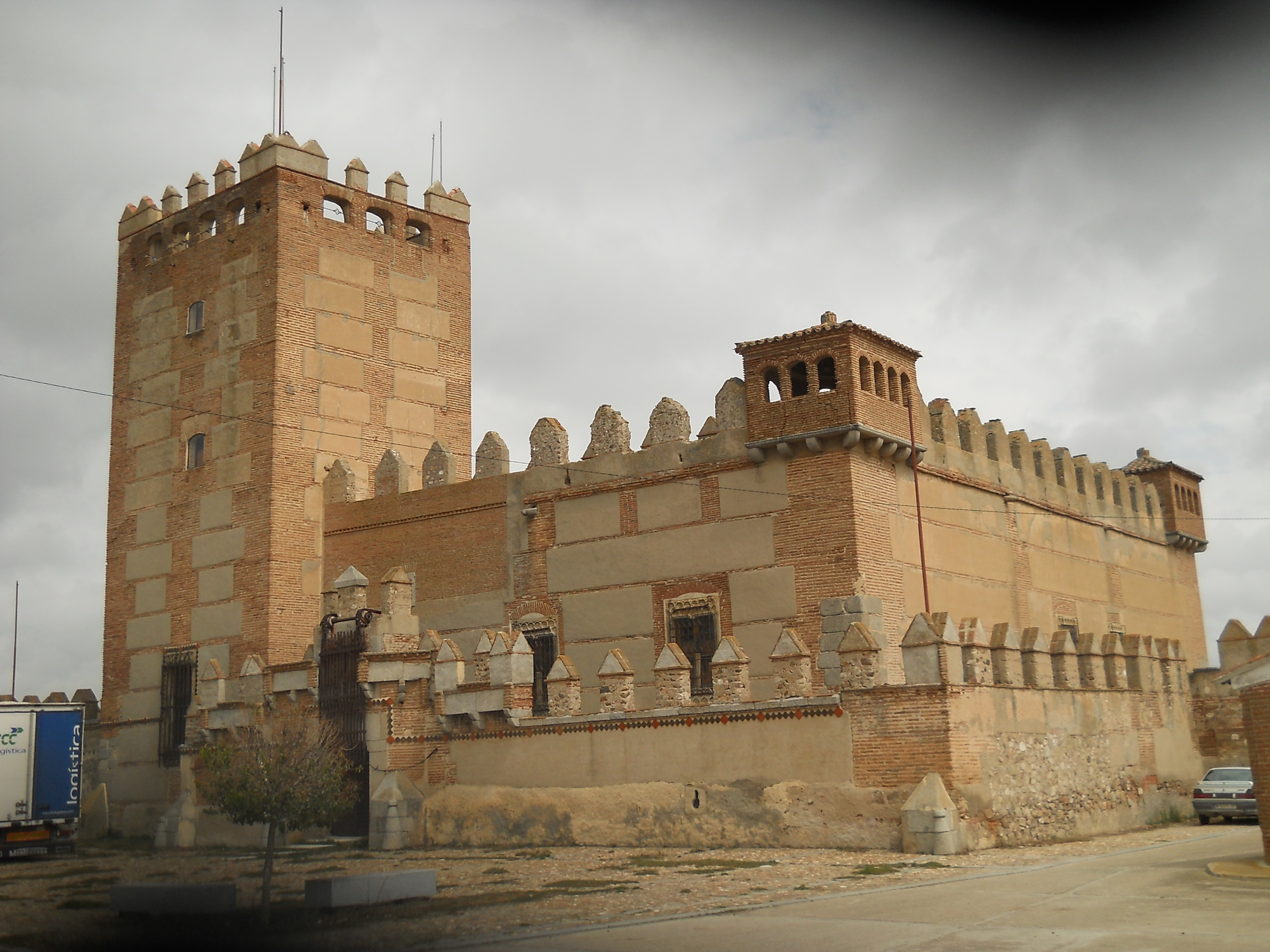
- Castle of Narros de Saldueña

- Flag Coat of arms

- Location in Spain. Narros de Saldueña (Spain)
- Coordinates: 40°52′31″N 4°52′10″W
- Country: Spain
- Autonomous community: Castile and León
- Province: Ávila
- Municipality: Narros de Saldueña

Area
  - Total: 9 km^{2} (3.5 sq mi)

Population (2025-01-01)
  - Total: 102
  - Density: 11/km^{2} (29/sq mi)
- Time zone: UTC+1 (CET)
  - Summer (DST): UTC+2 (CEST)
- Website: Official website

Narros de Saldueña is a municipality located in the province of Ávila, Castile and León, Spain.

== Population ==
Historical population
Year	Pop.	±% p.a.
2023	111	—
2024	106	−4.50%
2025	102	−3.77%
Source: INE
