= Narros =

- Municipality
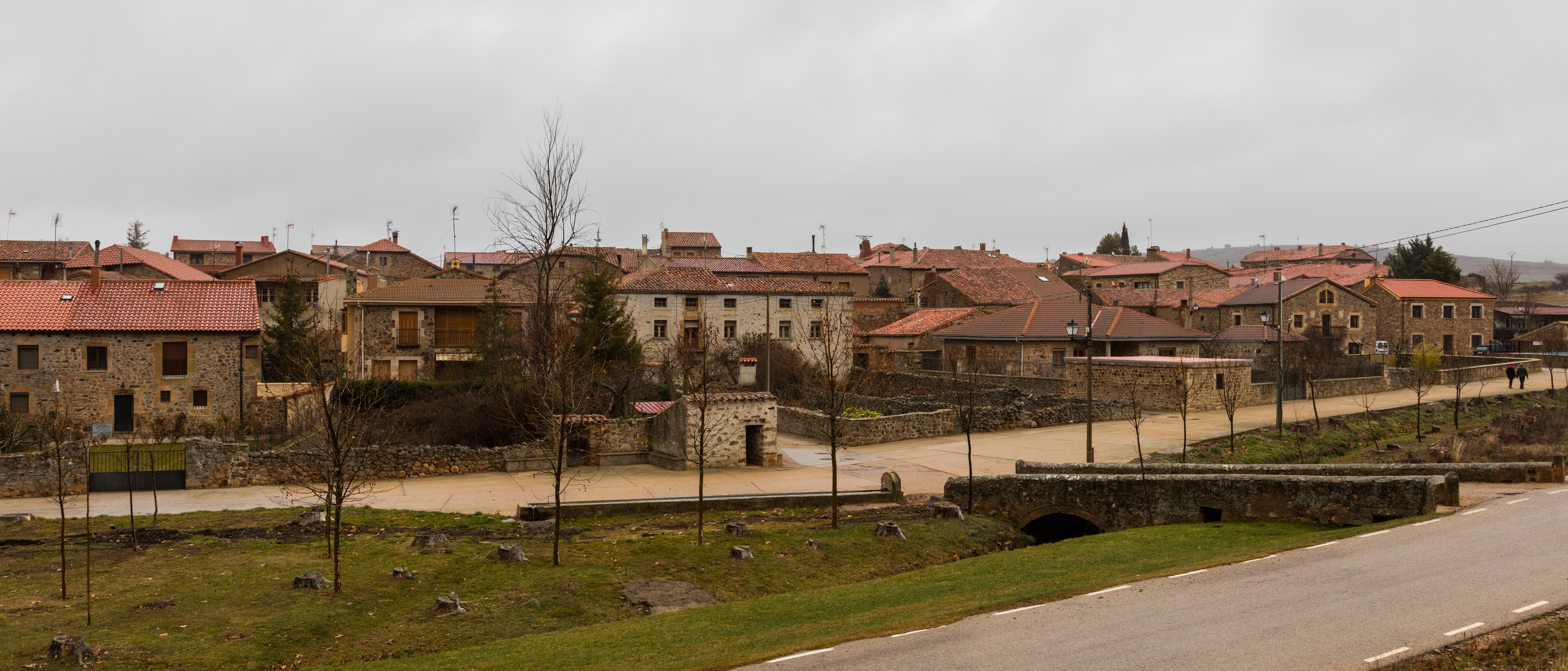

- Location in Spain. Narros (Spain)
- Coordinates: 41°50′55″N 2°17′40″W
- Country: Spain
- Autonomous community: Castile and León
- Province: Soria
- Municipality: Narros

Area
  - Total: 13 km^{2} (5.0 sq mi)

Population (2025-01-01)
  - Total: 68
  - Density: 5.2/km^{2} (14/sq mi)
- Time zone: UTC+1 (CET)
  - Summer (DST): UTC+2 (CEST)
- Website: Official website

Narros is a municipality located in the province of Soria, Castile and León, Spain. According to the 2004 census (INE), the municipality has a population of 50 inhabitants.
