= Narros del Puerto =

- municipality
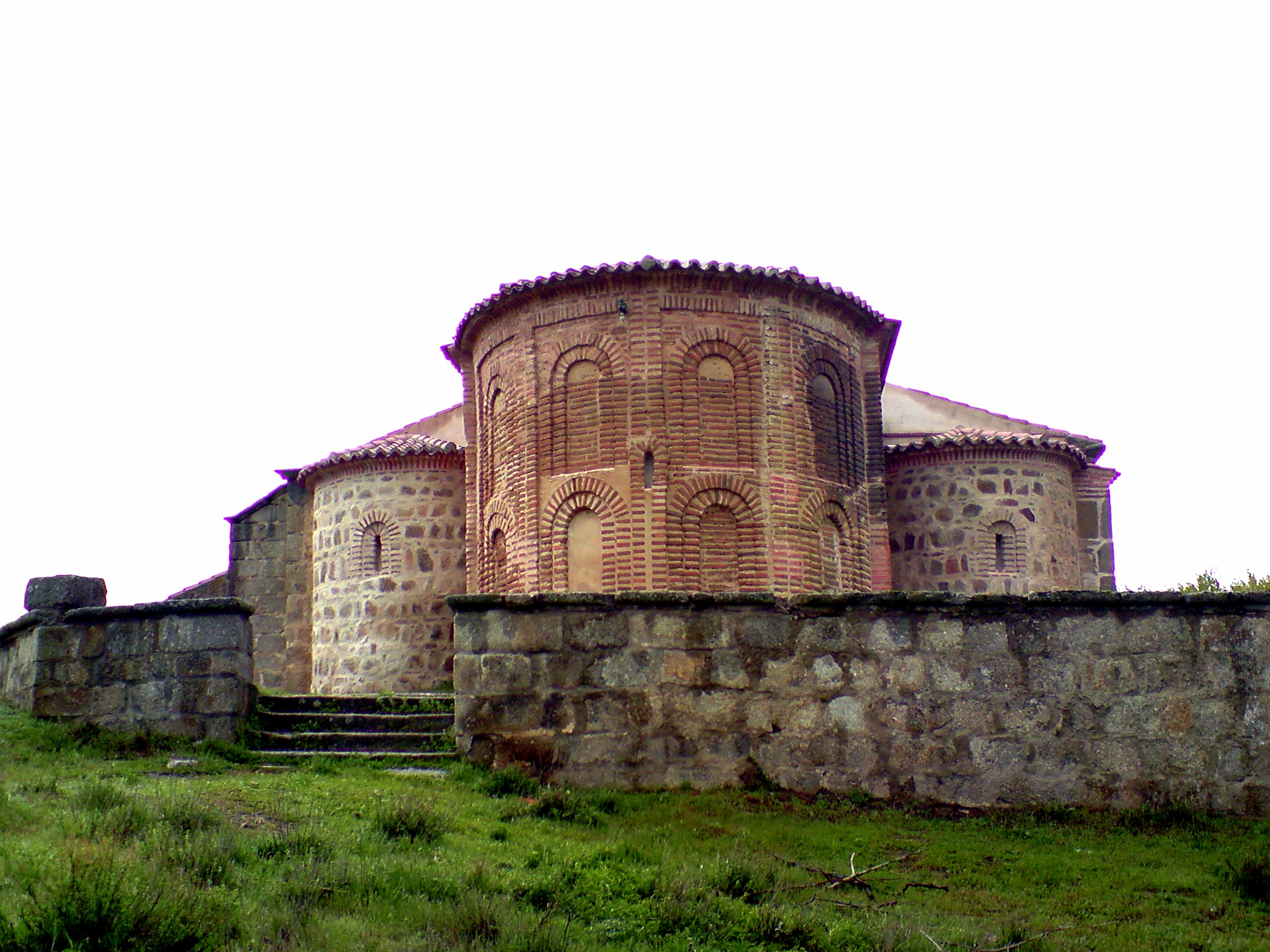
- Parish church of Nuestra Señora de la Asunción, mudéjar style

- Flag Coat of arms

- Extension of the municipal term within the province of Ávila

- Location in Spain. Narros del Puerto (Spain)
- Coordinates: 40°32′30″N 4°59′31″W
- Country: Spain
- Autonomous community: Castile and León
- Province: Ávila
- Municipality: Narros del Puerto

Area
  - Total: 10 km^{2} (3.9 sq mi)

Population (2025-01-01)
  - Total: 26
  - Density: 2.6/km^{2} (6.7/sq mi)
- Time zone: UTC+1 (CET)
  - Summer (DST): UTC+2 (CEST)
- Website: Official website

Narros del Puerto is a municipality located in the province of Ávila, Castile and León, Spain.

== Population ==
Historical population
Year	Pop.	±% p.a.
2023	28	—
2024	28	+0.00%
2025	26	−7.14%
Source: INE
