= Lev T. Perelman =

American physician and scientist

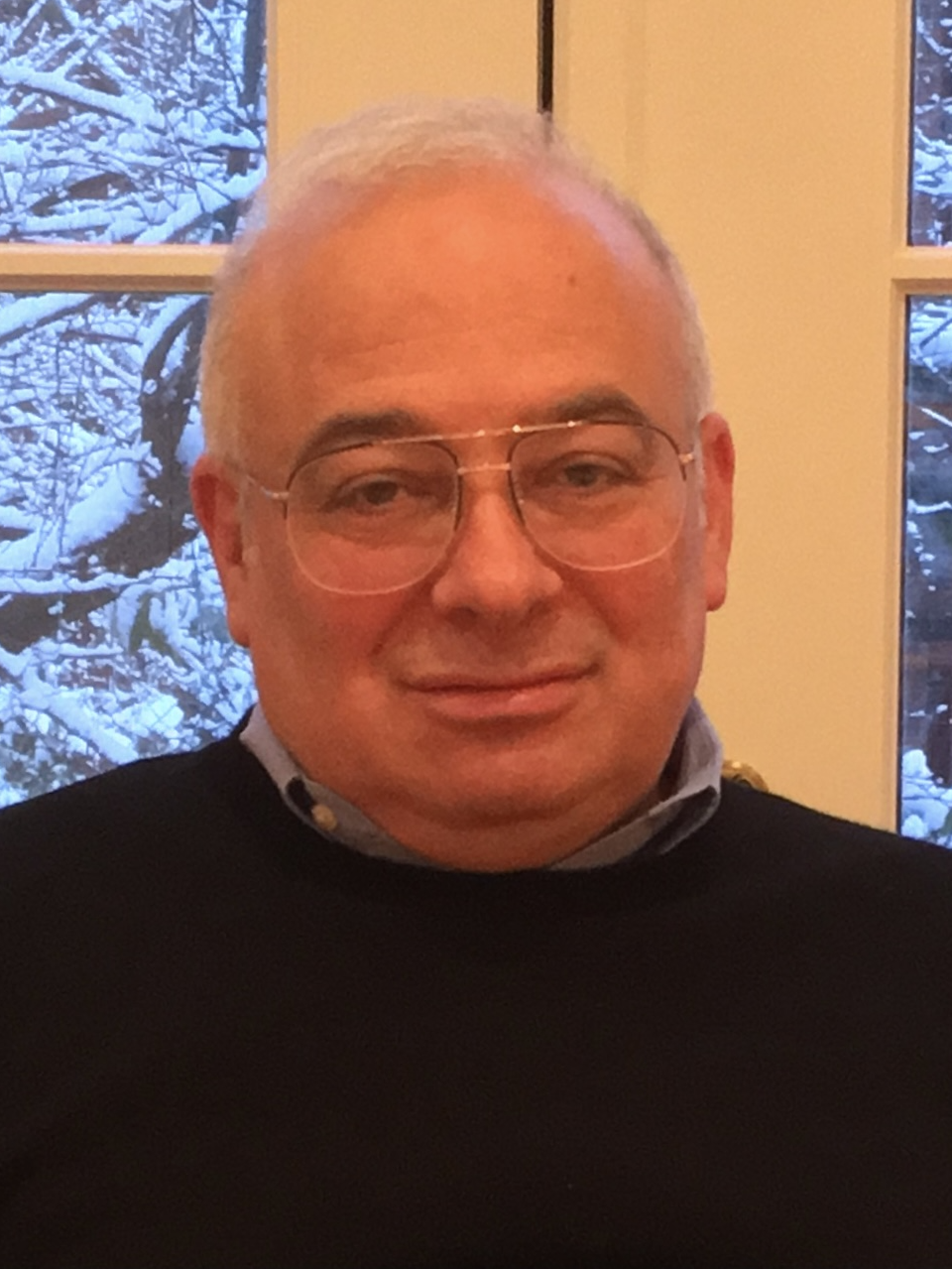
- Scientific career
- Fields: Biological physics, Bioengineering
- Workplaces: Harvard University Harvard Medical School Beth Israel Deaconess Medical Center
- Website: cabip-harvard.org/perelman

Lev T. Perelman is an American biological physicist and bioengineer at Harvard. He holds the Mary Tolan and Edward Grzelakowski Endowed Chair, is a professor of medicine at Harvard Medical School, and is the Director of the Center for Advanced Biomedical Imaging and Photonics at Beth Israel Deaconess Medical Center. He is known for his work on biomedical light scattering spectroscopy and application of optics and spectroscopy to life sciences and developmental and cell biology.

== Background and education ==
Perelman is the son of theoretical physicist Theodore L. Perelman, who solved the Conjugate convective heat transfer problem and made contributions in the development of a two-temperature model that describes electron and phonon temperature distributions in metals heated by ultrashort-pulsed lasers.

Perelman completed his undergraduate degree in theoretical physics from Belarus University and doctoral degree in physics from Institute of Physics in Minsk in 1989. He joined MIT in 1992 as a postdoctoral fellow in biological physics.

== Career ==
Perelman was appointed a principal scientist at MIT in 1995. In 2000, he joined the faculty at Harvard University, where he is currently a professor.

Perelman was a member of the United States Department of Health and Human Services Joint Working Group charged with setting up funding priorities in oncologic imaging in the U.S.

== Research ==
Perelman with Vadim Backman, an HST graduate student, introduced biomedical light scattering spectroscopy (LSS) in 1998. This approach was later applied for detection of precancer in esophagus, colon, urinary bladder and oral cavity, cervix, pancreatic cysts, and bile duct. This technique was later extended to subcellular scales with development of confocal light absorption and scattering spectroscopic microscopy for label-free subcellular functional imaging, sensing chromatin packing in live cells, and detection and identification of bacteria directly from whole blood.

Perelman's other contributions include demonstration of the world's first single-molecule detection with Surface-enhanced Raman Spectroscopy (SERS), and explanation of the critical role of stress confinement in short pulse laser ablation and laser surgery. He also developed with John Marshall the first non-hydrostatic model of the ocean known as the MIT General Circulation Model.
