= Critical Reviews in Microbiology =

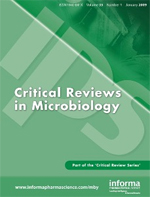
- Discipline: Microbiology
- Language: English
- Edited by: Gordon Ramage, PhD

Publication details
- History: First published 1971
- Publisher: Taylor and Francis Group (UK)
- Frequency: Quarterly
- Open access: no
- Impact factor: 6.5 (2022)

Standard abbreviations
- ISO 4: Crit. Rev. Microbiol.

Indexing
- ISSN: 1040-841X (print); 1549-7828 (web)

Links
- Journal homepage

Critical Reviews in Microbiology is an international, peer-reviewed academic journal that publishes comprehensive review articles covering all areas of medical microbiology. Areas covered by the journal include bacteriology, virology, microbial genetics, epidemiology, and diagnostic microbiology. It is published by Taylor and Francis Group.

As of 2024, the impact factor is 6.0.

== Core research areas ==
Expert reviewers address the following disciplines:

- Molecular biology
- Microbial genetics
- Microbial physiology
- Microbial biochemistry
- Microbial structure
- Medical microbiology
- Epidemiology
- Public health
- Diagnostic microbiology

== Publication format ==
Critical Reviews in Microbiology publishes 4 issues per year in simultaneous print and online editions.

Subscribers to the electronic edition of Critical Reviews in Microbiology receive access to the online archive, which dates back to 1971, as part of their subscription.
