= Cell unroofing =

Methods to isolate and expose cell membranes

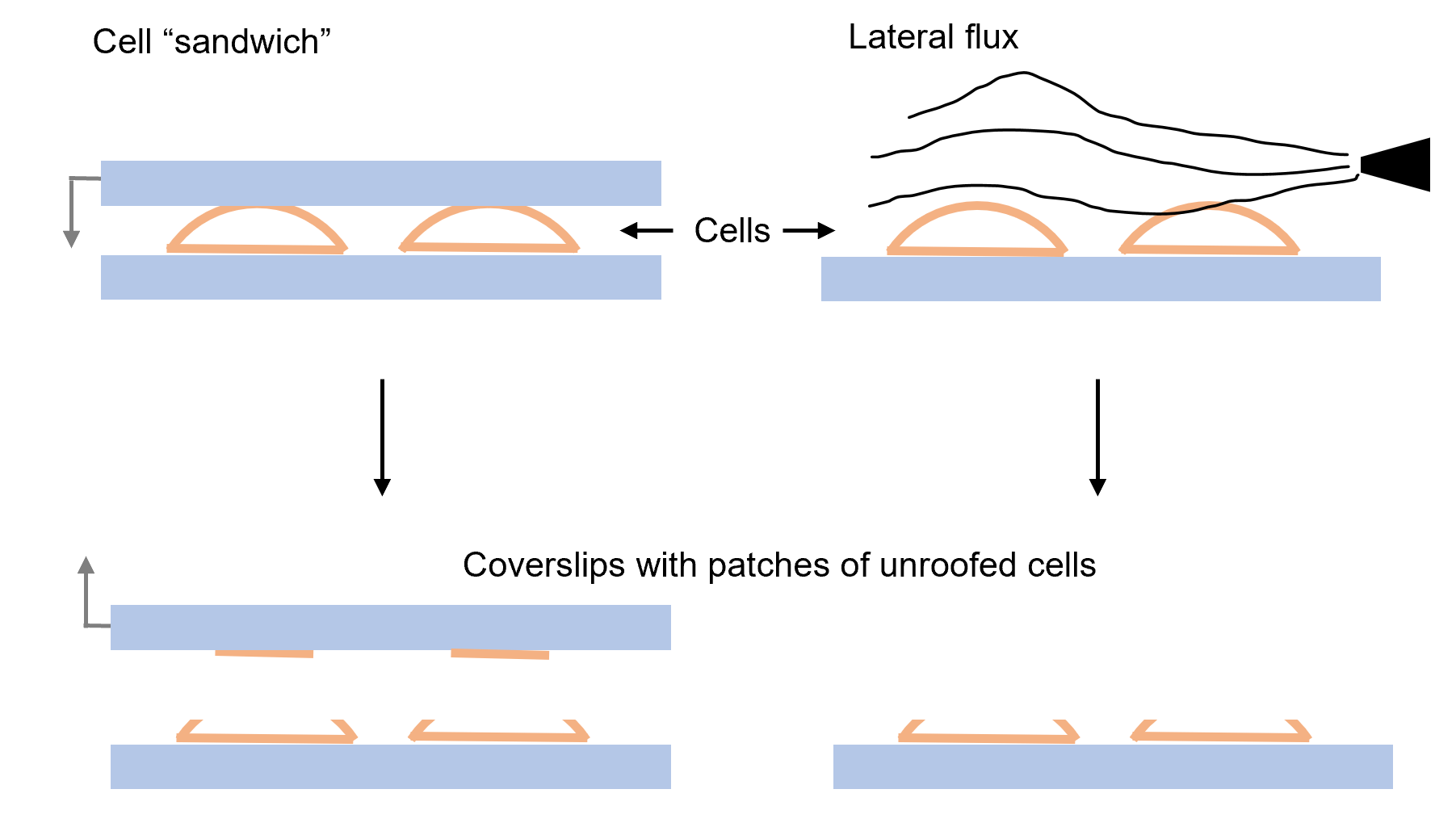
The most common processes of cell unroofing. (left) Sandwich of two cells between two coverslips. (right) Lateral flux of medium allows to break the cells.

Cell unroofing encompasses various methods used to isolate and expose the cell membrane of cells. Unlike the more common membrane extraction protocols performed with multiple steps of centrifugation (which aims to separate the membrane fraction from a cell lysate), cell unroofing aims to tear and preserve patches of the plasma membrane to perform in situ experiments using microscopy and biomedical spectroscopy.

== History ==
The first observation of the bi-layer cell membrane was made in 1959 on a cell section using the electron microscope. However, the first micrograph of the internal side of a cell dates back to 1977 by M.V. Nermut. Professor John Heuser made substantial contributions in the field, imaging the detailed internal structure of the membrane and the cytoskeleton bound to it with extensive use of the electron microscope.

It was only after the development of atomic force microscope operated in liquid that it became possible to image cell membranes in almost-physiological conditions and to test their mechanical properties.

== Methods ==
- Freeze-fracturing of monolayers
- Quick-freeze deep-etch electron microscopy and cryofixation
- Sonication for atomic force microscopy
- Single-cell unroofing

== See also ==
- Sonoporation
- Lysis
