= SLST =

SLST may refer to:

- Sri Lanka Standard Time, the time zone for Sri Lanka
- Sierra Leone Selection Trust, a mining finance house formed in 1934
- Single-locus sequence typing, a kind of DNA sequence-based method used in Diagnostic microbiology
- School of Life Sciences and Technology at Bandung Institute of Technology, Indonesia
- School of Life Science and Technology at ShanghaiTech University, Shanghai, China
