= Erika Crouch =

Pathologist

Erika Crouch is a professor of pathology and the Carol B. and Jerome T. Loeb Professor of Medical Education at Washington University in St. Louis.

== Early life and education ==
Crouch received her B.S. from Washington State University in 1972. Crouch earned her Ph.D. in 1978 and then her M.D. in 1979, both from the University of Washington. She was a postdoctoral fellow and then a resident in anatomic pathology at the University of Washington. She completed a fellowship in pulmonary pathology at the University of British Columbia as a Parker B. Francis Fellow. In 1983 Crouch joined the Washington University School of Medicine faculty, and as of 2024 she is the Carol B. and Jerome T. Loeb Professor of Medical Education.

== Career and research ==
Crouch is known for her research in collectins, a carbohydrate binding protein that is involved in the immune system. She identified CP4, a novel secreted collagenous protein, and went on to determine its molecular structure. Working with John Heuser, she examined a surfactant protein, SP-D, and researched the interactions between SP-D and influenza A virus. She has also used structure-function analysis via crystallographic analysis and site-directed mutagenesis.

== Publications ==
- Crouch, E. (1990-10-01). "Pathobiology of pulmonary fibrosis". American Journal of Physiology. Lung Cellular and Molecular Physiology. 259 (4): L159–L184. doi:10.1152/ajplung.1990.259.4.L159. ISSN 1040-0605. PMID 2221080.
- Kuan, S F; Rust, K; Crouch, E (1992-07-01). "Interactions of surfactant protein D with bacterial lipopolysaccharides. Surfactant protein D is an Escherichia coli-binding protein in bronchoalveolar lavage". Journal of Clinical Investigation. 90 (1): 97–106. doi:10.1172/JCI115861. ISSN 0021-9738. PMC 443067. PMID 1634623.
- Crouch, Erika; Hartshorn, Kevan; Ofek, Itzhak (2000). "Collectins and pulmonary innate immunity". Immunological Reviews. 173 (1): 52–65. doi:10.1034/j.1600-065X.2000.917311.x. ISSN 0105-2896.
- Crouch, Erika; Wright, Jo Rae (2001). "Surfactant Proteins A and D and Pulmonary Host Defense". Annual Review of Physiology. 63 (1): 521–554. doi:10.1146/annurev.physiol.63.1.521. ISSN 0066-4278. PMID 11181966.
