= Parvez Haris =

- Born: Parvez Iqbal Haris; 1964 (age 61–62); Moulvibazar, Sylhet District, East Pakistan
- Education: University of London (UK)
- Known for: work on arsenic
- Scientific career
- Fields: Biomedical Science
- Workplaces: De Montfort University (UK)

Parvez Haris (Bengali: পারভেজ হারিস) is a professor of biomedical science at the School of Allied Health Sciences in De Montfort University, United Kingdom. He is an Editor-in-Chief of Biomedical Spectroscopy and Imaging. He is a Fellow of the Royal Society of Chemistry and Public Health as well. He is going to deliver speech for the International Biotech Symposium 2021 in Bangladesh. Bengali scientists Parvez Haris has been selected in the top 1 percent or 100 thousand scientists list of the University of Stanford in the United States. He is a member of International Scientific Committee of Nutrition and Food Engineering. He received the UK Bangladesh Catalysts of Commerce and Industry Awards (UKBCCI) on the category of business innovation in 2019.

== Early life and career ==
Professor Haris was born in Moulvibazar District of Sylhet Division in Bangladesh in 1964. He came to Britain at the age of 10 in 1975 when his father owned a restaurant in Cardiff.

In 1989, Parvez obtained his PhD in Biochemistry from the Royal Free Hospital School of Medicine, University of London, under the supervision of Professor Dennis Chapman FRS. Succeeding his post doctoral fellowship, he started his career as a lecturer in Biochemistry at De Montfort University, Leicester in 1996. He has conducted a significant number of research on Arsenic contamination of water, and its effects on the food chain. In 2011, on a conference at Rize Üniversitesi, Haris presented how the toxic elements in the soil through foods effect on human health. Besides, he is continuing research on other biochemistry subjects including coronavirus, Human Health, Nutrition, Environmental Pollution etc. He is well known for his contribution of reducing arsenic from rice. A group of scientists led by him found a link between arsenic and rice consumption among a small number of British Bangladeshis. Research team conducted by him discovered that rice grown in Sylhet has much lower arsenic concentration than similar types of rice from other regions of Bangladesh. Even the scientists found that some varieties of Sylheti aromatic rice had lower arsenic than the well-known Basmati aromatic rice from India and Pakistan.

== Selected publications ==
Some of Haris notable publications:

- The conformational analysis of peptides using Fourier transform IR spectroscopy
- FTIR spectroscopic characterization of protein structure in aqueous and non-aqueous media
- Determination of protein secondary structure using factor analysis of infrared spectra
- Fourier transform infrared spectrometric analysis of protein conformation: effect of sampling method and stress factors
- Does Fourier-transform infrared spectroscopy provide useful information on protein structures?
- Conformational transitions in poly (L-lysine): studies using Fourier transform infrared spectroscopy
- A survey of arsenic in foodstuffs on sale in the United Kingdom and imported from Bangladesh
- Fourier transform infrared spectroscopic studies of calcium-binding proteins
- Temperature-induced changes in protein structures studied by Fourier transform infrared spectroscopy and global analysis
