= Light scattering spectroscopy =

Spectroscopic technique

Light scattering spectroscopy (LSS) is a spectroscopic technique typically used to evaluate morphological changes in epithelial cells in order to study mucosal tissue and detect early cancer and precancer.

Light scattering spectroscopy relies upon elastic scattering of photons reflected from the epithelium. Most of the signal is generated by light scattering from small intracellular structures, but larger intracellular structures, such as nuclei, also scatter light, with their relative contribution increasing in the backscatter direction. As changes in the morphology of epithelial cells are hallmarks of pre-cancer and early cancer, LSS can be used for early cancer diagnosis.

In addition to photons backscattering from epithelial cells, a major portion of photons penetrates the epithelium, reaching optically turbid connective tissue where they are scattered multiple times and partially absorbed by hemoglobin. As a result, it is not possible to measure single backscattering events directly in human tissue, with polarization gating and spatial gating well-suited for endoscopy applications.

== History ==
Lev T. Perelman, principal scientist at MIT, and Vadim Backman, graduate student in Harvard- MIT Health Sciences and Technology program introduced LSS in 1998.

== Applications ==
Light scattering spectroscopy has been applied for detection of precancer in many organs including esophagus, colon, urinary bladder, oral cavity, cervix, pancreatic cyst, stomach, skin, and bile duct.
