= Diagnostic microbiology =

Diagnostic microbiology is the study of microbial identification. Since the discovery of the germ theory of disease, scientists have been finding ways to harvest specific organisms. Using methods such as differential media or genome sequencing, physicians and scientists can observe novel functions in organisms for more effective and accurate diagnosis of organisms. Methods used in diagnostic microbiology are often used to take advantage of a particular difference in organisms and attain information about what species it can be identified as, which is often through a reference of previous studies. New studies provide information that others can reference so that scientists can attain a basic understanding of the organism they are examining.

== Aerobic vs anaerobic ==
Anaerobic organisms require an oxygen-free environment. When culturing anaerobic microbes, broths are often flushed with nitrogen gas to extinguish oxygen present, and growth can also occur on media in a chamber without oxygen present. Sodium resazurin can be added to indicate redox potential. Cultures are to be incubated in an oxygen-free environment for 48 hours at 35 °C before growth is examined.

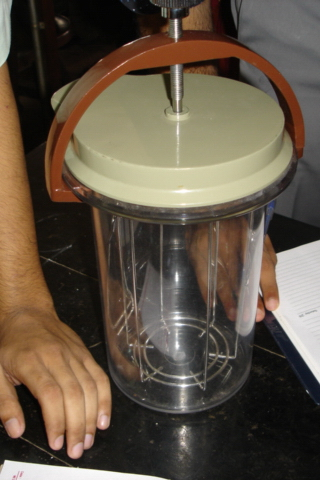
Gas-Pak jar

Anaerobic bacteria collection can come from a variety of sources in patient samples, including blood, bile, bone marrow, cerebrospinal fluid, direct lung aspirate, tissue biopsies from a normally sterile site, fluid from a normally sterile site (like a joint), dental, abscess, abdominal or pelvic abscess, knife, gunshot, or surgical wound, or severe burn.

== Incubation length ==
Incubation times vary based upon the microbe that requires culturing. Traditional culturing techniques, for example, require less than 24 hours culture time for Escherichia coli but 6–8 weeks for successful culturing of Mycobacterium tuberculosis before definitive results are expressed. A benefit of non-culture tests is that physicians and microbiologists are not handicapped by waiting periods.

Incubation follows a growth curve variable for every microorganism. Cultures follow a lag, log, stationary, and finally death phase. The lag phase is not well known in microbiology, but it is speculated that this phase consists of the microorganism adjusting to its environment by synthesizing proteins specific for the surrounding habitat. The log phase is the period where a culture experiences logarithmic growth until nutrients become scarce. The stationary phase is when culture concentration is the highest and cells stop reproducing. When nutrients in the environment are depleting, organisms enter the death phase where toxic metabolites become abundant and nutrients are depleted to the point where cell death exceeds reproduction.

== Rapid identification after culture ==
=== Automated culturing systems ===
Automatic cell culturing systems are becoming popular because of their ability to maintain a sterile growth environment and remove strain on the laboratory staff involving repetitive experimentation. Laboratories can also set incubation times to adjust for the lag period involved in bacterial growth.

=== Blood cultures ===
Blood cultures can allow for diagnostic results after culture. Recent development of DNA based PCR diagnostics have provided faster diagnostic results as opposed to overnight biochemical tests. DNA diagnostic test can diagnose with near the same specificity as biochemical test, resulting in the same diagnostic result in 90% of cases.

=== Breath tests ===
Breath test for microbial diagnosis on patients has been used in a clinical setting for bacteria, including Helicobacter pylori. Diagnostic test using the breath of patients look for metabolites excreted that were manufactured by the infectious microorganism. H. pylori is tested by testing patients for CO_{2} concentration, increased because of the organism's ability to convert urea into other derivatives.

== Conventional tests ==
=== Antibody detection ===
A benefit of antibody detection (ELISA) is that protein identification on a microorganism becomes faster than a western blot. Antibody detection works by attaching an indicator to an antibody with a known specificity and observing whether the antibody attaches. ELISA can also indicate viral presence and is highly specific, having a detection specificity of 10^{−9}-10^{−12} moles per litre detection. By knowing the epitope sequence of the antibody, ELISA can also be used for antigen detection in a sample.

=== Histological detection and culture ===
Histological methods used for microbiology are useful because of their ability to quickly identify a disease present in a tissue biopsy.

== Microscopy ==
=== Staining ===
Staining used in microbiology identification include: Gram stain, Acid-fast stain, Giemsa stain, India ink stain, Ziehl–Neelsen stain.

== Analytical methods ==
=== Mass spectrometry ===
MALDI-TOF (Matrix-assisted laser desorption/ionization - time of flight) is a specific type of mass spectrometry that is able to identify microorganisms. A pure culture is isolated and spread directly on a stainless steel or disposable target. The cells are lysed and overlaid with a matrix, which forms protein complexes with the bacterial proteins. The MALDI fires a laser and ionizes the protein complexes, which break off and travel up the vacuum where they are detected based on mass and charge. The resulting protein spectra is compared to a known database of previously catalogued organisms, resulting in rapid diagnosis of microorganisms. Recent studies have suggested that these tests can become specific enough to diagnose down to the sub-species level by observing novel biomarkers.

The MALDI-TOF identification method requires pure cultures that are less than 72 hours old. This places the organism in log phase with an abundance of ribosomal proteins, which are the most common proteins detected in the spectra. Identifications with this technology can also be impacted if the culture is exposed to cold temperatures, as this would change the typical protein distribution.

== Optical methods ==
=== Immunofluorescence ===
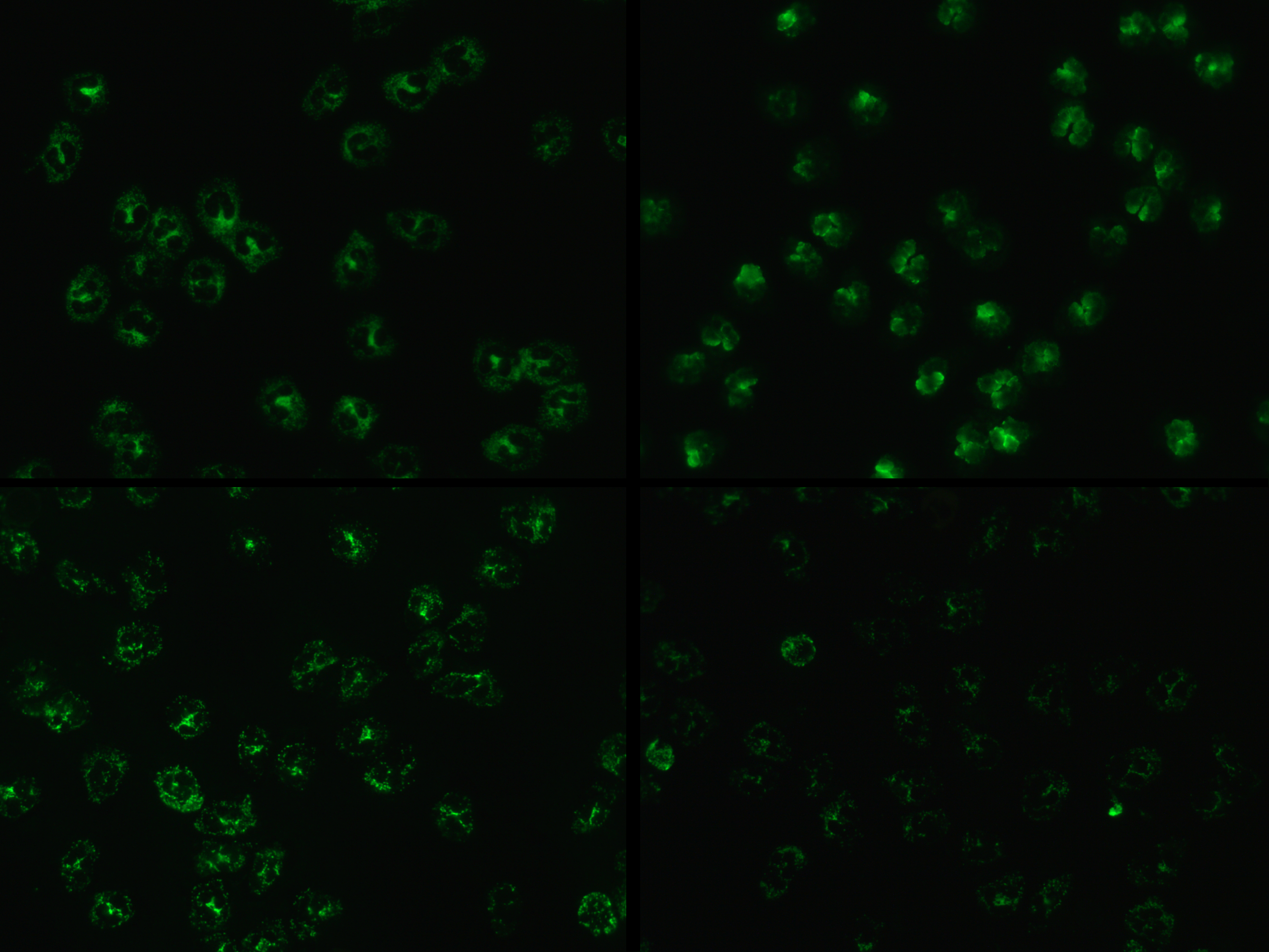
Immunofluorescence

Immunofluorescence is performed by the production of anti-antibodies with a fluorescent molecule attached, making it a chemiluminescent molecule, which provides a glow when subject to ultraviolet light. Antibodies are added to a bacterial solution, providing an antigen for the binding of fluorescent anti-antibody adherence.

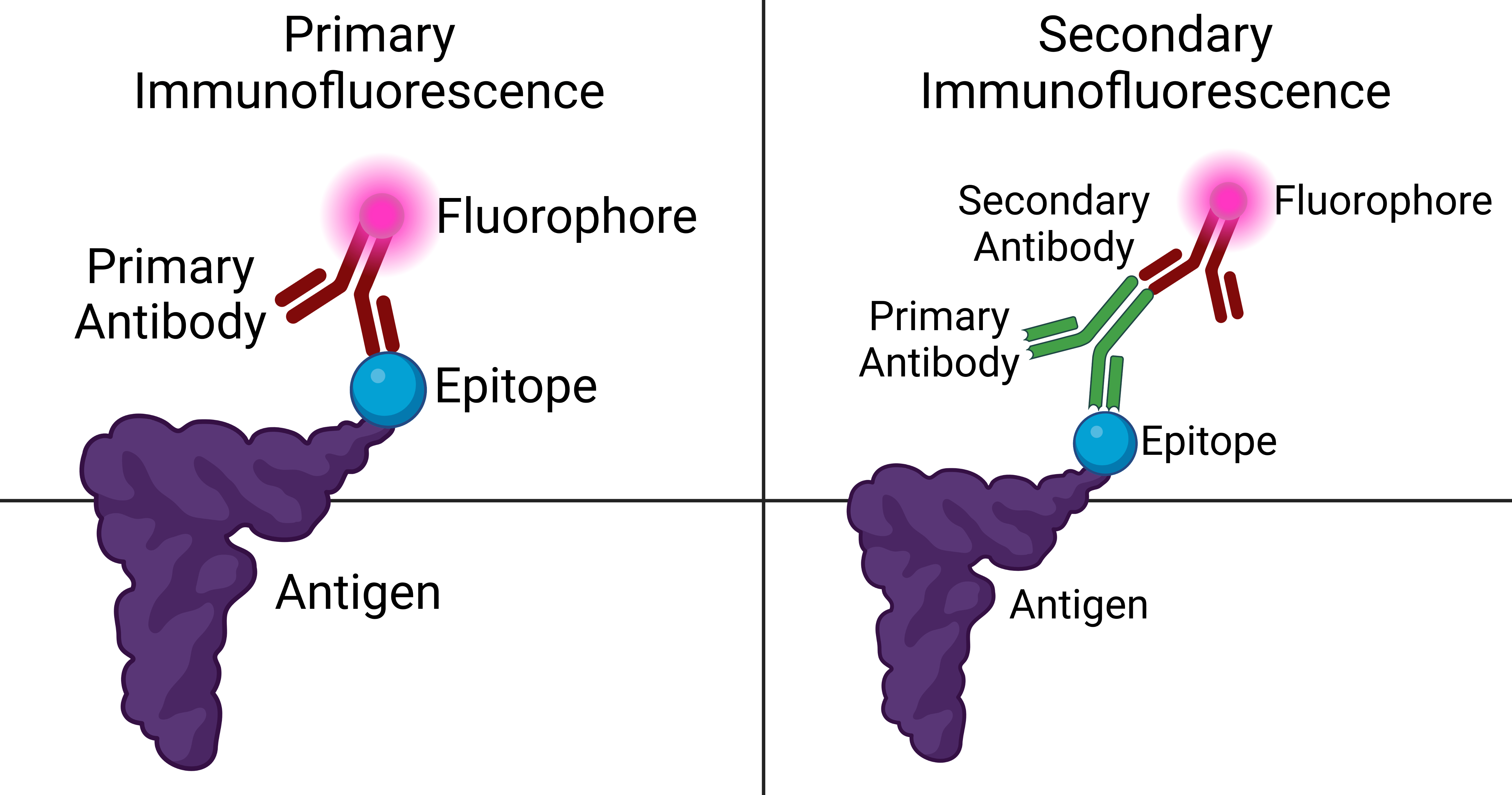
Immunofluorescence

=== Light scattering ===
Light scattering has been used for the detection and classification of bacteria. Approaches include analysis of the angular dependence of scattering as well as spectroscopic methods. Spectroscopic implementations include elastic light scattering and light scattering spectroscopy. Light scattering spectroscopy can be combined with microscopic imaging or dual-angle configurations to enable calibration-independent measurements. Light scattering spectroscopy, along with related confocal light absorption and scattering spectroscopic microscopy, has also been applied to the rapid identification of bacteria directly from whole blood.

== Biochemical profile-based microbial identification systems ==
Phenotypic tests are used to identify microbes based on metabolic and biochemical pathways present in those microbes. There are many automated and semi-automated commercial systems available. These methods can be very informative but are not as accurate as MALDI-TOF or genotypic methods.

=== 6.5% salt broth ===
The 6.5% salt broth test is used to analyze the tolerance level of various bacteria under halophilic conditions. This test is used because most organisms cannot survive in high salt concentrations while Staphylococci, Enterococci, and Aerococci are all expected to tolerate 6.5% NaCl concentrations.

=== Acetate utilization ===
The acetate utilization test is used primarily to differentiate between Escherichia coli from members of the genus Shigella. Many of the Escherichia coli strains have the capability of the utilization of acetate for a sole carbon and energy source, while Shigella does not. Since acetate utilization results in an increase in pH, an indicator is added that changes color under conditions of acetate utilization.

=== ALA ===
An ALA (delta-aminolevulinic acid) test is used to test for the presence of porphyrin and cytochrome compounds. Finding hemin synthesis indicates that the organism is likely Haemophilus.

=== Aminopeptidase ===
The aminopeptidase test analyzes bacteria for the production of the enzyme L-alanine-aminopeptidase, an enzyme found in many gram-negative bacteria. Adding L-Alanine-4-nitroanilide hydrochloride to a bacterial culture works as an indicator, changing to a yellow color in the presence of L-alanine-aminopeptidase.

=== Analytical profile index ===
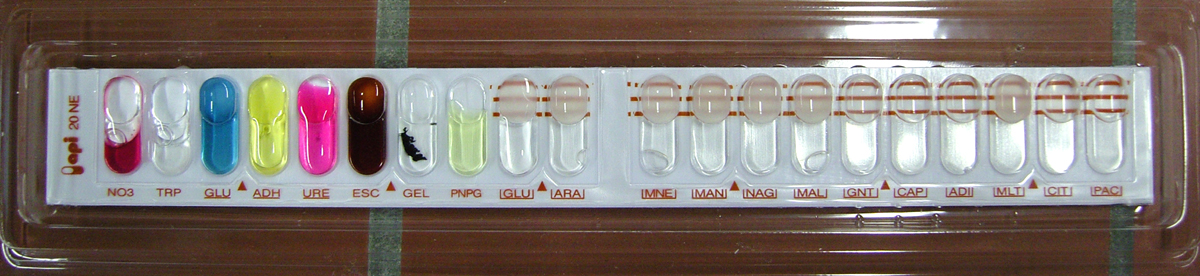
API 20NE rapid test system, one day after sample application

An analytical profile index is a fast identification system based on biochemical incubation tests. Usually, this test is used to quickly diagnose clinically relevant bacteria by allowing physicians to run about 20 tests at one time.

=== Antibiotic disks ===
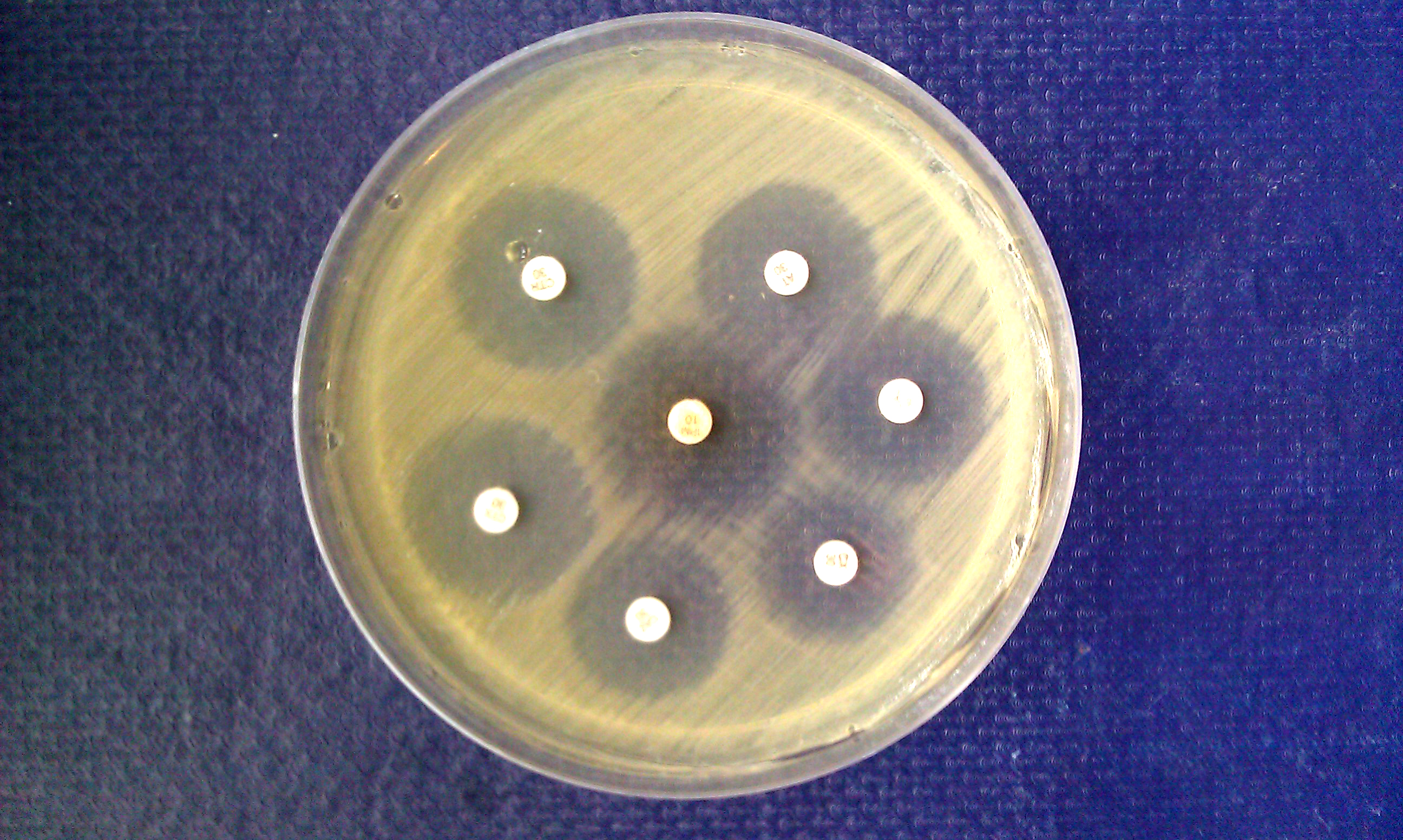
Antibiotic susceptible bacteria

Antibiotic disks are used to test the ability for an antibiotic to inhibit growth of a microorganism. This method, which is commonly used with Mueller–Hinton agar, is used by evenly seeding bacteria over a petri dish and applying an antibiotic treated disk to the top of the agar. By observing the ring formed around the disk formed due to the lack of bacterial growth, the zone of inhibition can be found, which is used to find the susceptibility of an organism to an antibiotic.

=== Bile esculin agar ===
The bile esculin test is used to differentiate members of the genus Enterococcus from Streptococcus.

=== Bile solubility ===
Bile solubility is used to test for Streptococcus Pneumoniae due to their unique ability to be lysed by sodium deoxycholate. Lysis indicates S. Pneumoniae while no lysis does not.

=== CAMP ===
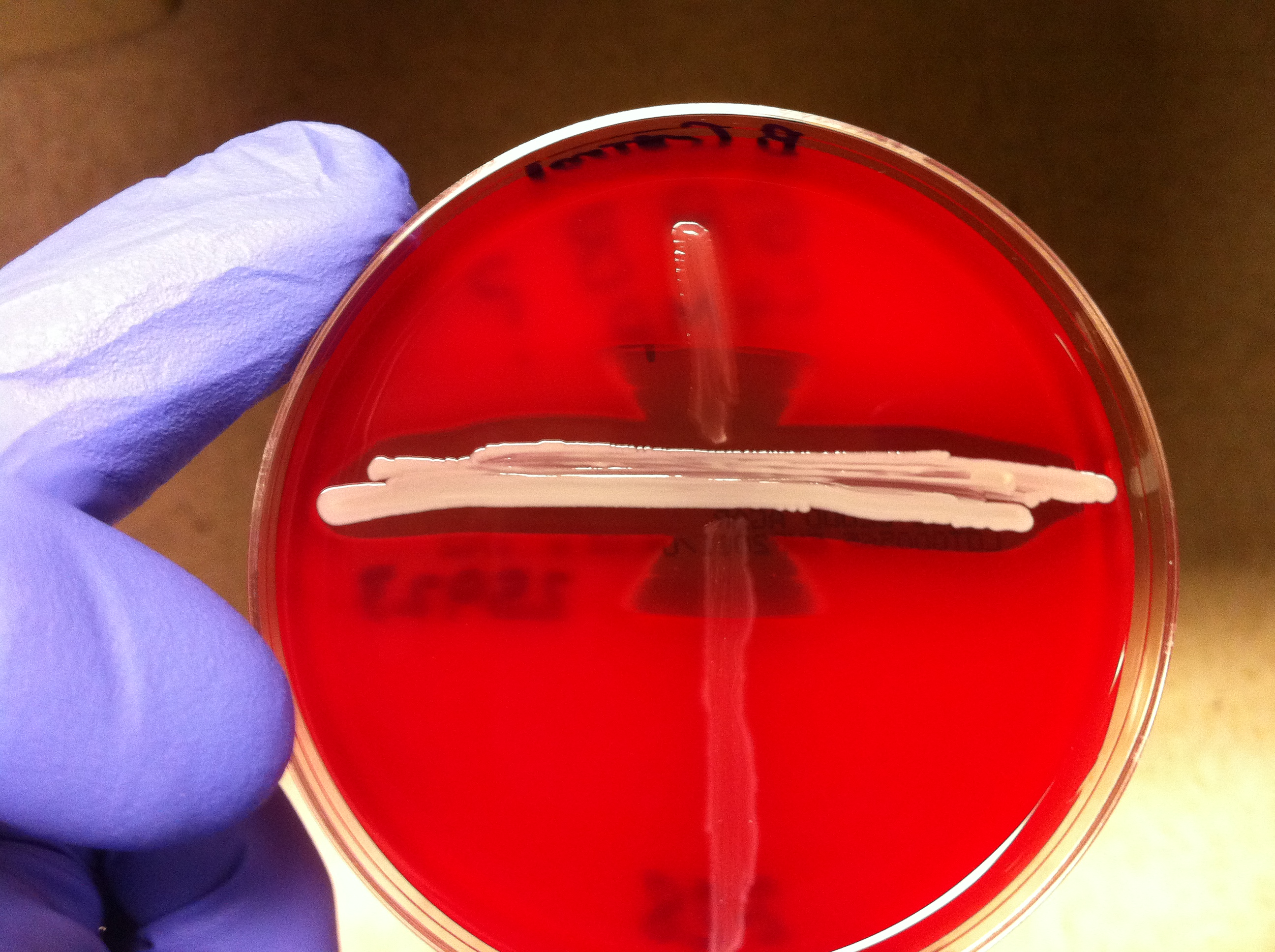
A positive CAMP test with the characteristic arrowhead shaped zone of hemolysis

A CAMP test is used to differentiate between Streptococcus agalactiae and other species of beta-hemolytic Streptococcus. This biochemical test uses the fact that Streptococcus agalactiae excretes a CAMP substance, making it slightly more hemolytic, which can be observed on blood agar media.

=== Catalase ===
The catalase test tests whether a microbe produces the enzyme catalase, which catalyzes the breakdown of hydrogen peroxide. Smearing a colony sample onto a glass slide and adding a solution of hydrogen peroxide (3% H_{2}O_{2}) will indicate whether the enzyme is present or not. Bubbling is a positive test while nothing happening is a negative result.

=== Cetrimide agar ===
Cetrimide agar slants is a selective agar used to isolate Pseudomonas aeruginosa.

=== CLO tests ===
The CLO test is used to diagnose H. Pylori in patient biopsies. A sample of the biopsy is places in a medium containing urea, which H. Pylori can use in some of its biochemical pathways. Consumption of urea indicates a positive test result.

=== Coagulase ===
The coagulase test determines whether an organism can produce the enzyme coagulase, which causes the fibrin to clot. Inoculating a plasma test tube with the microbe indicates whether coagulase is produced. A clot indicates the presence of coagulase, while no clot indicates the lack of coagulase.

=== DNA hydrolysis ===
DNase agar is used to test whether a microbe can produce the exoenzyme deoxyribonuclease (DNase), which hydrolyzes DNA. Methyl green is used as an indicator in the growth medium because it is a cation that provides an opaqueness to a medium with the presence of negatively charged DNA strands. When DNA is cleaved, the media becomes clear, showing the presence of DNase activity. DNA hydrolysis is tested by growing an organism on a DNase Test Agar plate (providing nutrients and DNA) and then checking the plate for hydrolysis. The agar plate has DNA-methyl green complex, and if the organism on the agar does hydrolyze DNA then the green color fades and the colony is surrounded by a colorless zone.

=== Gelatin ===
The gelatin test is used to analyze whether a microbe can hydrolyze gelatin with the enzyme gelatinase. The gelatin makes the agar solid, so if an organism can produce gelatinase and consume gelatin as an energy and carbon source, the agar will become liquid during growth.

=== Gonocheck II ===
The Gonochek II test, a commercial biochemical test, is used to differentiate between Neisseria lactamica, Neisseria meningitidis, N. gonorrhoeae and Moraxella catarrhalis. The principle behind this test is to use enzymes native to the organism to create a colored product in the presence of foreign molecules. The chemical 5-bromo-4-chloro-3-indolyl-beta-D-galactoside is used in the test because N. lactamica can hydrolyze it with the production of β-galactosidase, turning the solution into a blue color. Gamma-glutamyl-p-nitroanilide is added to the solution to indicate whether the bacteria is N. meningitides, which hydrolyzes the molecule with the enzyme gamma-glutamylaminopeptidase, producing a yellow end-product. Prolyl-4-methoxynaphthylamide is in the solution to identify N. gonorrhoeae because of its ability to hydrolyze the molecule with the enzyme hydroxyprolylaminopeptidase, creating a red-pink derivative. M. catarrhalis contains none of these enzymes, rendering the solution colorless. This process of identification takes approximately 30 minutes in total.

=== Hippurate ===
The Hippurate diagnostic test is used to differentiate between Gardnerella vaginalis, Campylobacter jejuni, Listeria monocytogenes and group B streptococci using the chemical Hippurate. The Hippurate hydrolysis pathway, capable by organisms with the necessary enzymes, produces glycine as a byproduct. Using the indicator ninhydrin, which changes color in the presence of glycine, will display either a colorless product, a negative result, of a dark blue color, a positive result.

=== Indole butyrate disk ===
An indole butyrate disc is used to differentiate between Neisseria gonorrhoeae (negative result) and Moraxella catarrhalis (positive result). This test involves a butyrate disk, which when smeared with a culture, will change color for a positive result after 5 minutes of incubation. A blue color is the result of a positive test.

=== Lysine iron agar slant ===
The lysine iron agar slant test is used to tell whether an organism can decarboxylate lysine and/or produce hydrogen sulfide.

=== Lysostaphin ===
The lysostaphin test is used to differentiate between Staphylococcus and Micrococcus bacteria. Lysostaphin can lyse Staphylococcus, but Micrococcus bacteria are resistant to the chemical.

=== Methyl red test ===
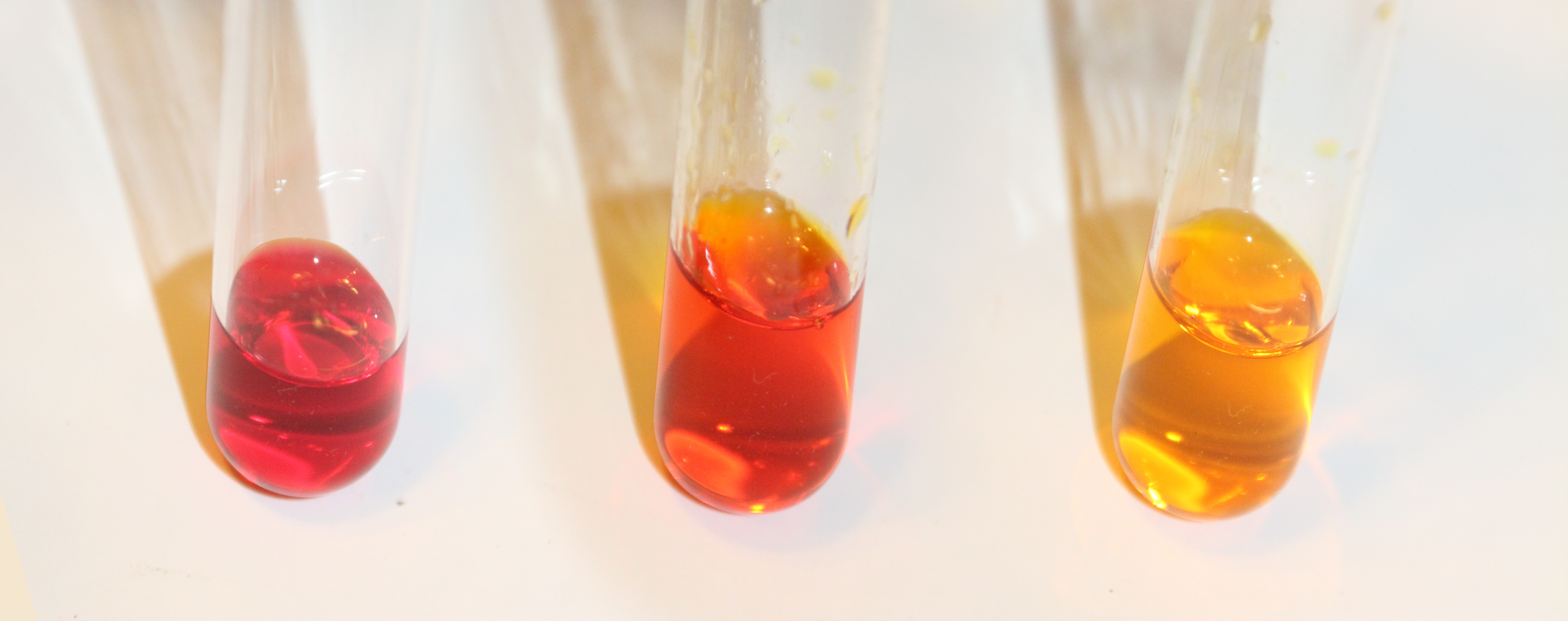
Color transition of Methyl red solution under different acid-base conditions

The methyl red test is used to analyze whether a bacterium produces acids through sugar fermentation.

=== Microdase ===
Microdase is a modified oxidase test used to differentiate Micrococcus from Staphylococcus by testing for the presence of cytochrome c. A positive result produces a dark color around the inoculant while negative result produces no color change.

=== Nitrite test ===
The nitrite test is commonly used to diagnose urinary tract infections by measuring the concentrations of nitrite in solution, indicating the presence of a gram-negative organism. A simple nitrite test can be performed by adding 4 M sulfuric acid to the sample until acidic, and then adding 0.1 M iron (II) sulfate to the solution. A positive test for nitrite is indicated by a dark brown solution, arising from the iron-nitric oxide complex ion.

=== Oxidase ===
The oxidase test indicates whether a microbe is aerobic. By using the chemical N,N,N,N-tetramethyl-1,4-phenylendiamin, an electron acceptor that changes color when oxidized by cytochrome c oxidase, one can deduce whether a microbe can perform aerobic respiration. A color change to purple indicates oxidative respiration while no color change provides evidence that the organism does not have cytochrome c oxidase.

=== Phenylalanine deaminase ===
The phenylalanine deaminase test is used to tell whether an organism can produce the enzyme deaminase. Deaminase is the enzyme that can deaminate the amino acid phenylalanine into the products ammonia and phenylpyruvic acid. The test is performed by adding phenylalanine to the growth medium and allowing growth to occur. After incubation, 10% ferric chloride is added to the solution, which will react with phenylpyruvic acid in solution to make a dark green color, resulting in a positive test result.

=== PYR ===
The PYR test is used to check if an organism has enzymes to hydrolyze L-pyrrolidonyl- β-napthylamide. A positive result indicates that the organism is either group A streptococcus and/or group D enterococcus.

=== Reverse CAMP ===
The reverse CAMP test utilizes the synergetic hemolytic abilities of the CAMP factor produced by Streptococcus agalactiae with the α-toxin produced by Clostridium perfringens. Streaking these two organisms perpendicular to each other on a blood agar plate will yield a "bow-tie" clearing of the blood agar by the hemolytic capabilities of the two organisms' toxins. Incubation requires 24 hours at 37 °C.

=== Simmons' citrate agar ===
Simmons' citrate agar is used to test whether an organism can utilize citrate for its sole carbon source.

=== Spot indole ===
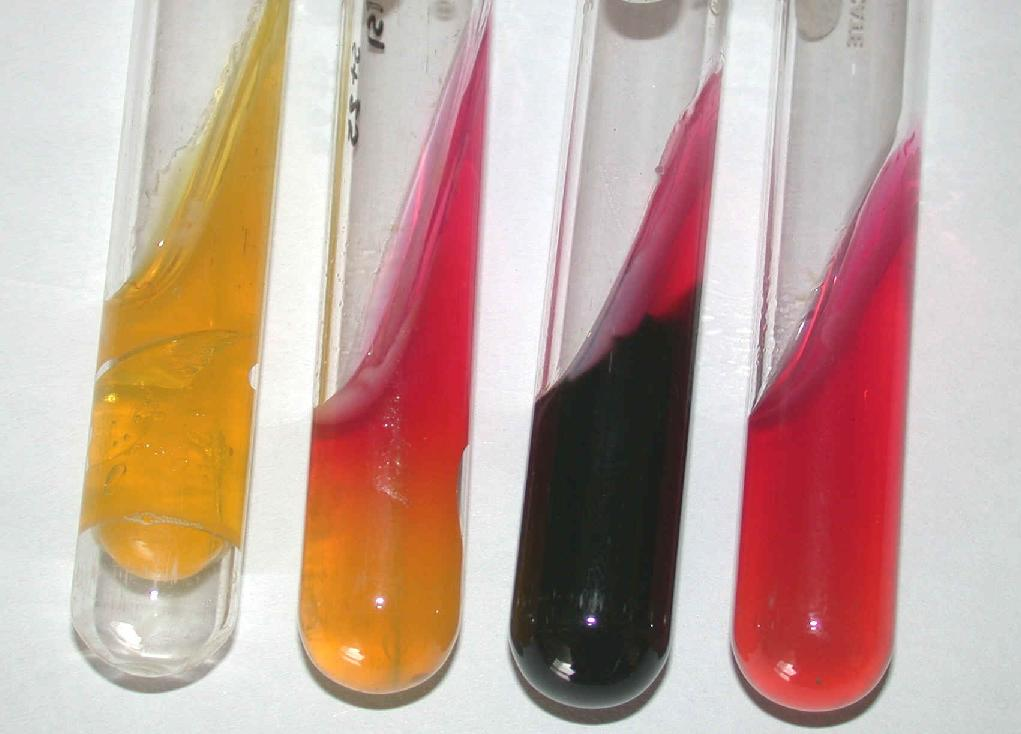
TSI Agar

The spot indole test is used to determine if a microbe can deaminate tryptophan to produce indole. This test is performed by saturating a piece of filter paper with Indole Kovacs Reagent and scraping a portion of microbe onto the paper. A color to a pink-red color indicates a positive result while no color change indicates the lack of tryptophanase.

=== Sulphide indole motility medium ===
The sulfide indole motility medium is a three-part test for an organism's ability to reduce sulfates, produce indoles, and motile ability.

=== TSI slant ===
The triple sugar iron (TSI) test is a differential media used to tell whether an organism can ferment glucose, sucrose, and/or lactose and whether an organism can produce hydrogen sulfide gas.

=== Urea agar slant ===
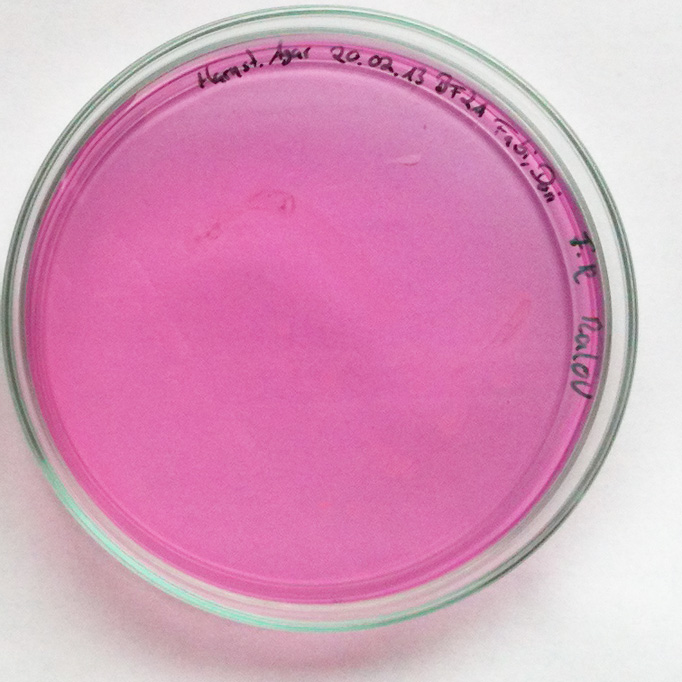
Raoultella planticola on urea agar

The urease agar slant is used to measure an organism's ability to produce urease, an enzyme capable to digesting urea in carbon dioxide and ammonia through hydrolysis. Because ammonia is alkaline, the media contains phenol red, an indicator that changes from orange to pink when a pH increases above 8.1. When ammonia is increased to high enough concentrations, the media will change to a pink color, indicating the presence of urease production.

=== Voges–Proskauer test ===
The Voges-Proskauer test detects whether a bacterium is producing the product acetoin from the digestion of glucose.

== Cellular fatty acid based identification ==
=== Mycolic acid analysis ===
Mycolic acid analysis has been an evolving field of study for gas-liquid chromatography, as it offers a solution to slow growth rates in Mycobacterium. Mycolic acid is a fatty acid found in the disease tuberculosis, offering a chemical target for diagnosticians to look for.

== Nucleic acid extraction techniques ==
=== Cesium chloride / Ethidium bromide density gradient centrifugation ===
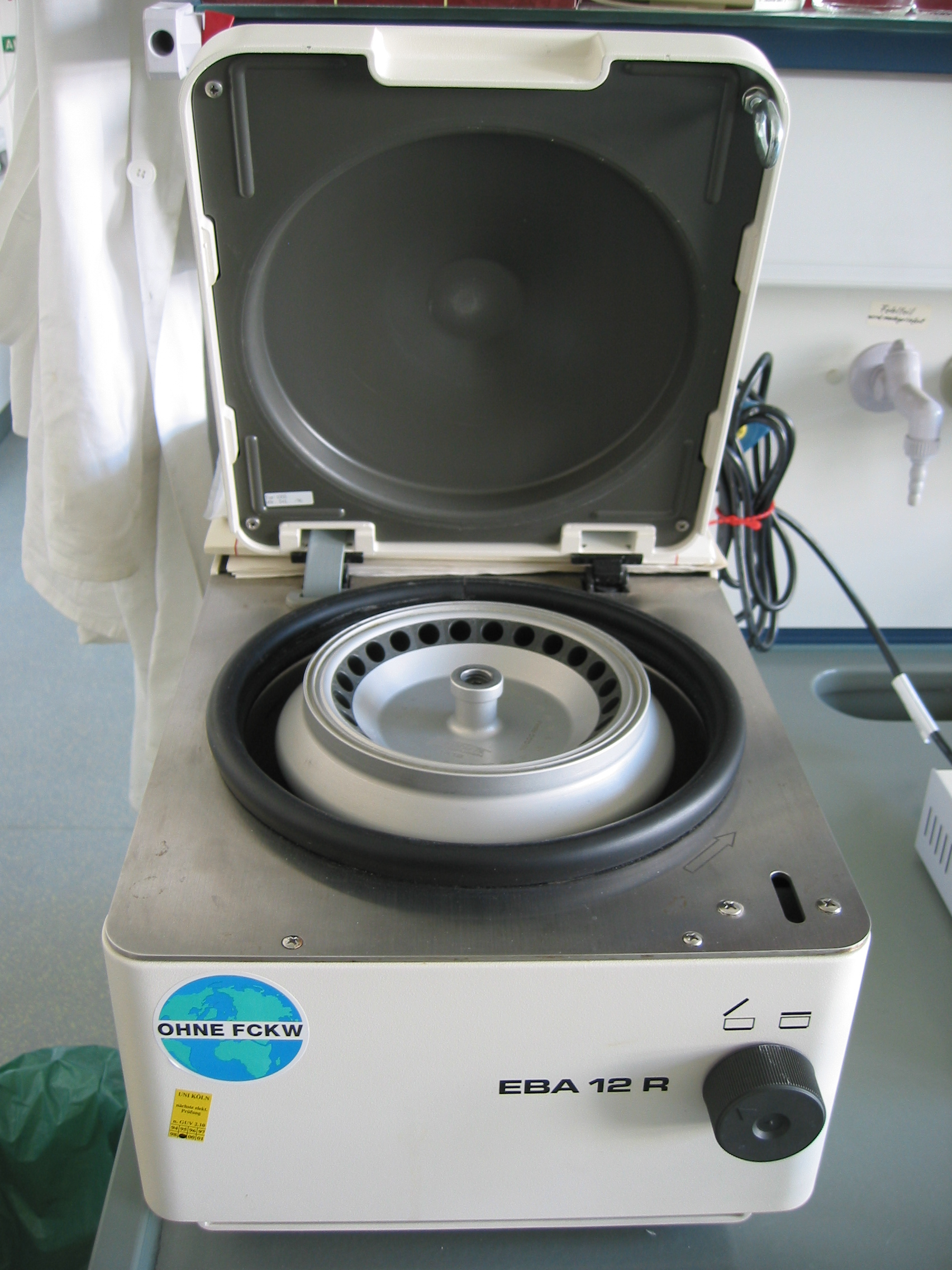
Tabletop centrifuge

With high speed buoyant density ultracentrifugation, a density gradient is created with caesium chloride in water. DNA will go to the density that reflects its own, and ethidium bromide is then added to enhance the visuals the nucleic acid band provides.

=== Magnetic bead method ===
New extraction techniques have been developed using magnetic beads for the purification of nucleic acids by taking advantage of the charged and polymeric nature of long strand of DNA. Beads are both uncoated to increase surface are and yield, while others are more selective by being coated with functional groups that interact with the polymers present in microbes. One common method is to use polyethylene glycol to drive DNA binding to the magnetic beads. The molecular weight and concentration of the PEG will control what molecular weight DNA binds.

=== Phenol–chloroform extraction ===
Phenol-Chloroform extraction is a liquid-liquid method used by biochemists to separate nucleic acids from proteins and lipids after cells have been lysed. This method has fallen out of favor with scientists and microbiologists as there are easier methods available which require less hazardous chemicals.

=== Solid phase extraction ===
Solid phase extraction which separates long polymers like DNA from other substances found in the cells. This is similar to magnetic beads, where the solid phase is fixed and selectively binds a cellular component, allowing for its isolation.

== Methods with electrophoretic outputs ==
Gel electrophoresis is a technique to separate macromolecules by taking advantage of the charge on many of the molecules found in nucleic acids and protein. This is also the key method for Sanger sequencing. Fluorescent-labeled DNA fragments move through a polymer and are separated with one base precision. A laser excites the fluorescent tag and is captured by a camera. The result is an electropherogram which reads the DNA sequence.

== Restriction enzyme based ==
=== Optical mapping ===
Optical mapping is a technique using multiple restriction enzymes to create a genomic "barcode" which can be referenced back to diagnose an unknown microbe.

=== Pulsed-field gel electrophoresis ===
Pulsed-field gel electrophoresis is a technique used to separate large DNA in an electric field that periodically changes direction. By cutting segments of the DNA with restriction enzymes, pulse-field can be used to separate out the segments of DNA.

=== Restriction enzymes then gel electrophoresis ===
Restriction enzymes are first used to recognize and then cut specific nucleic acid sequences. These cut pieces of DNA can be run through a gel electrophoresis to allow diagnostics of the organism by referencing back to previous gel electrophoresis results.

=== Ribotyping ===
Ribotyping is a rapid automated method for microbial diagnostics, testing for rRNA in bacteria using restriction enzyme digestion and Southern blot technology.

== PCR-based ==
=== Multiple loci VNTR analysis ===
Multiple-locus VNTR analysis is a test used to detect variable number tandem repeats, which act as a DNA fingerprint in microbial diagnostics.

== DNA sequence-based methods ==
=== Multi-locus sequence typing ===
Multilocus sequence typing (MLST) is the sequencing of numerous loci to diagnose an organism by comparing DNA sequences to a database of known organisms. This method is often used to compare isolates or strains of the same species to see if they are indistinguishable or different from each other. This is common for tracking food-borne illnesses and public health outbreaks. Most MLST assays are published in scientific journals so consistent methods are used worldwide. There are also public databases available for tracking and comparisons.

=== Single-locus sequence typing ===
Single-locus sequence typing (SLST) is the sequencing of a single locus of an organism to produce data that can be used for strain-level comparisons between isolates of the same species.

=== Genotypic identifications ===
For bacterial identifications, microbiologists sequence the 16S rRNA gene and for fungal identifications, sequence the ITS regions. Both regions are part of the ribosomal operon so they are well-conserved but provide enough variation to allow for speciation. Accurate identifications require high quality sequence data, a robust data analysis, and a broad microbial database of known organisms. It is also useful to use a Neighbor Joining tree or some other phylogenetic approach to make the identification.

=== Whole genome sequencing (WGS) ===
Whole genome sequencing and genomics applications can be used for large-scale alignment and comparative analysis with both bacteria and fungi. WGS can be used to diagnose, identify, or characterize an organism down to the individual base pairs by sequencing the entire genome. WGS can also be used to compare the genomes or average nucleotide identity (ANI) of the shared genes between two strains and can be a robust way to compare genetic relatedness and if often used for investigating organisms involved in foodborne illness and other outbreaks.
