= Electron phenomenological spectroscopy =

Electron phenomenological spectroscopy (EPS) is based on the correlations between integral optical characteristics and properties of substance as a single whole quantum continuum: spectrum-properties and color-properties. According to these laws the physicochemical properties of substance solutions in ultraviolet (UV), visible light and near infrared (IR) regions of the electromagnetic spectrum are in proportion to the quantity of radiation absorbed. Such aspects of electron spectroscopy have been shown in the works of Mikhail Yu Dolomatov and has been named electron phenomenological spectroscopy because the integral characteristics of the system are studied. Qualitatively, new laws appear on the integral level.

Unlike conventional spectroscopic methods, the EPS studies substances as a comprehensive quantum continuum without separating the spectrum of the substance into characteristic spectral bands on certain frequencies or wavelengths of individual functional groups or components.

New physical phenomena appear in consideration of the integral systems which absorb radiation. For example, EPS is based on the regularities of the correlation of physico-chemical properties and integral spectral characteristics for UV or (and) visible regions of the electromagnetic spectrum (so-called law spectrum-properties). Color is also an integral characteristic of a visible spectrum. Therefore, the consequence of this is so-called law color-properties. All this allow the use of EPS methods for studying individual and complex multicomponent substances.

Methods of EPS were developed after 1988 by the group of Mikhail Yu. Dolomatov.

The EPS methods belong to number of new effective techniques of monitoring and control and can be used in petroleum and petrochemical industries, environmental monitoring, electronics, biophysics, medicine, criminalistics, space exploration and other fields.
