= John Heuser =

American biologist

John Edward Heuser
- John Heuser
- Born: August 29, 1942 (age 84); Pittsburgh, Pennsylvania
- Awards: 2011 Member, National Academy of Sciences 2007 Fellow, American Association for the Advancement of Science 2005 Fellow, American Academy of Arts and Sciences
- Scientific career
- Fields: Cell Biology, Physiology, Biophysics, Electron Microscopy
- Workplaces: Washington University in St. Louis, Institute for Integrated Cell and Material Sciences, Kyoto, Japan
- Doctoral advisor: J. David Robertson

John E. Heuser (born August 29, 1942) is an American Professor of Biophysics in the department of Cell Biology and Physiology at the Washington University School of Medicine as well as a Professor at the Institute for Integrated Cell-Material Sciences (iCeMS) at Kyoto University.

Heuser created quick-freeze deep-etch electron microscopy (a variant of cell unroofing), a pioneering technique that lets biologists take detailed pictures of fleeting events inside living cells. For decades, Heuser has used this technique to capture details of the molecular mechanisms that underlie many basic biological activities, including nerve cell signal transmission, muscle contraction, and most recently, the fusion of viruses with cells during the spread of infection. He compares quick-freeze deep-etch electron microscopy to using a stroboscopic flash to freeze the action in a photograph. To make it possible to image the frozen sample with an electron microscope, Heuser adds an ultra-thin film of metallic platinum that molds snugly against the sample's frozen surface contours. He and others in his lab have worked to make the equipment and procedures necessary for this process available to researchers around the world. Currently Heuser has patents pending on Washington University in St. Louis's behalf for even more advanced versions of his quick-freezing machines.

Heuser graduated magna cum laude from Harvard Medical School in 1969 and joined the Washington University faculty as a professor of biophysics in 1980. He is currently associate editor of the Journal of Neurocytology and previously served as associate editor of the Journal of Cell Biology. His curriculum vitae lists over 200 scientific publications. He was elected as a fellow of the American Academy of Arts and Sciences class of 2005 and of the American Association for the Advancement of Science in 2007. Heuser was also elected as a member of the National Academy of Sciences in 2011.

== Current research ==
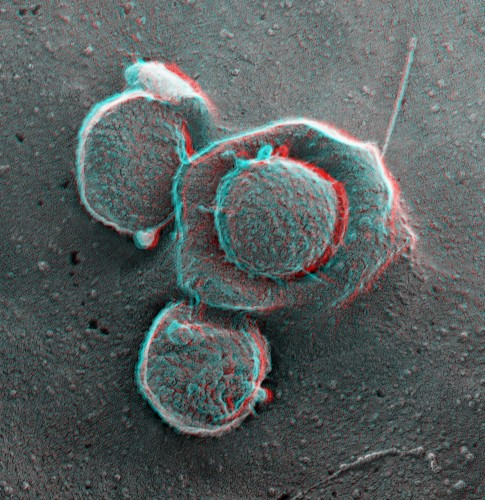
Electron micrograph of a vaccinia virus

- Freeze-etch electron microscopy as applied to cell and molecular biology
- The structural basis of neuronal synaptic transmission

Heuser explains what is done in his laboratory:

"Electron microscopic visualization of everything from whole cells to individual molecules is the work of this laboratory. Special emphasis is given to developing new methods of sample preparation that will achieve a more natural, life-like appearance of samples in the microscope. To accomplish this, we have developed what is now called the "quick-freeze, deep-etch" technique for electron microscopy and have disseminated the equipment and procedures needed to carry out this technique throughout the field. Currently, we use "quick-freezing" to capture several different cellular processes that are unusually fleeting, including membrane budding and fusion, synaptic vesicle discharge during neural transmission, movement of cilia and flagella on vertebrate and protozoal cells, and muscle contraction. In each case, our aim has been to visualize the underlying molecular mechanisms occurring. We also use "deep-etching" to visualize molecules adsorbed to inert substrates in order to study mechanisms of macromolecular assembly and disassembly in various processes, including remodeling of cytoskeletons, clathrin-mediated endocytosis, cell-to-cell recognition, and the formation of extracellular matrices."

== Experience ==
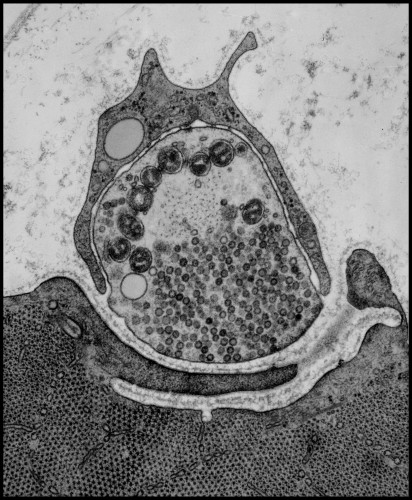
Electron micrograph of a neuromuscular junction

- 1963–1967 Undergraduate apprentice in J. David Robertson's Electron Microscopy Lab, Harvard Medical School and the McLean Hospital, Belmont, MA
- 1969–1974 USPHS Fellow and Moseley Travelling Fellow of Harvard University, as Postdoctoral trainee in the Biophysics Unit of University College, London, under Sir Bernard Katz and Ricardo Miledi
- 1970–1972 USPHS Military service in Laboratory of Neuropathology and Neuroanatomical Sciences, NINCDS, Bethesda, MD with Thomas S. Reese
- 1974–1980 Assistant, Associate, and then Full Professor of Physiology, Department of Physiology, University of California, San Francisco, CA
- 1980– Professor of Biophysics, Department of Cell Biology and Physiology, Washington University School of Medicine, St. Louis, MO

== Professional activities ==
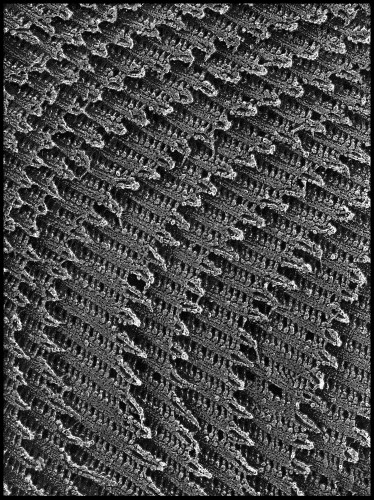
Electron micrograph, Axostyle

- Associate Editor of the Journal of Cell Biology (past)
- Associate Editor of the Journal of Neurocytology (current)
- Service to editorial boards of: Journal of Neurophysiology, Brain Research, Journal of Comparative Neurology, Journal of Neuroscience Methods, Gastroenterology, Cell, Anatomical Record, Journal of Molecular Biology
- Ad Hoc reviewer for NINCDS, NCRR, and National Science Foundation

== Education ==
- 1964, B.A., cum laude, Harvard College
- 1969, M.D., magna cum laude, Harvard Medical School
- 1970–1973, Graduate studies in Biophysics, University College London

== Teaching activities ==
- 1980–1990 Lecturer (with Ursula Goodenough) in Washington University Medical School courses in Cell Biology and Neurobiology
- 1980–1995 Lecturer in Washington University Medical School courses in Cell Biology and Neurobiology
- 1974–1980 Lecturer in UCSF graduate and medical school courses: Cell Biology and Neurobiology
- 1974–1995 Director of graduate course: Neuroanatomical Methods
- 1975–1998 Instructor, Summer Neurobiology course, Marine Biological Laboratory, Woods Hole, MA

== Awards ==
Heuser was the inaugural recipient of the American Association for Anatomy's R.R. Bensley Award, in 1979.
