= Sulphide Indole Motility medium =

Sulphide Indole Motility (SIM) medium is a bacterial growth medium which tests for the ability to reduce sulfates, the ability to produce indoles, and motility. This combination of challenges in one mixture is convenient and commercially available in stab tubes. Inoculated needles are then punctured into the culture and incubated, if the culture becomes cloudy the bacteria were able to infiltrate the media and survive. This method is particularly useful for pathogenic bacteria which are dangerous to handle on wet mount slides
