= Lysine iron agar =

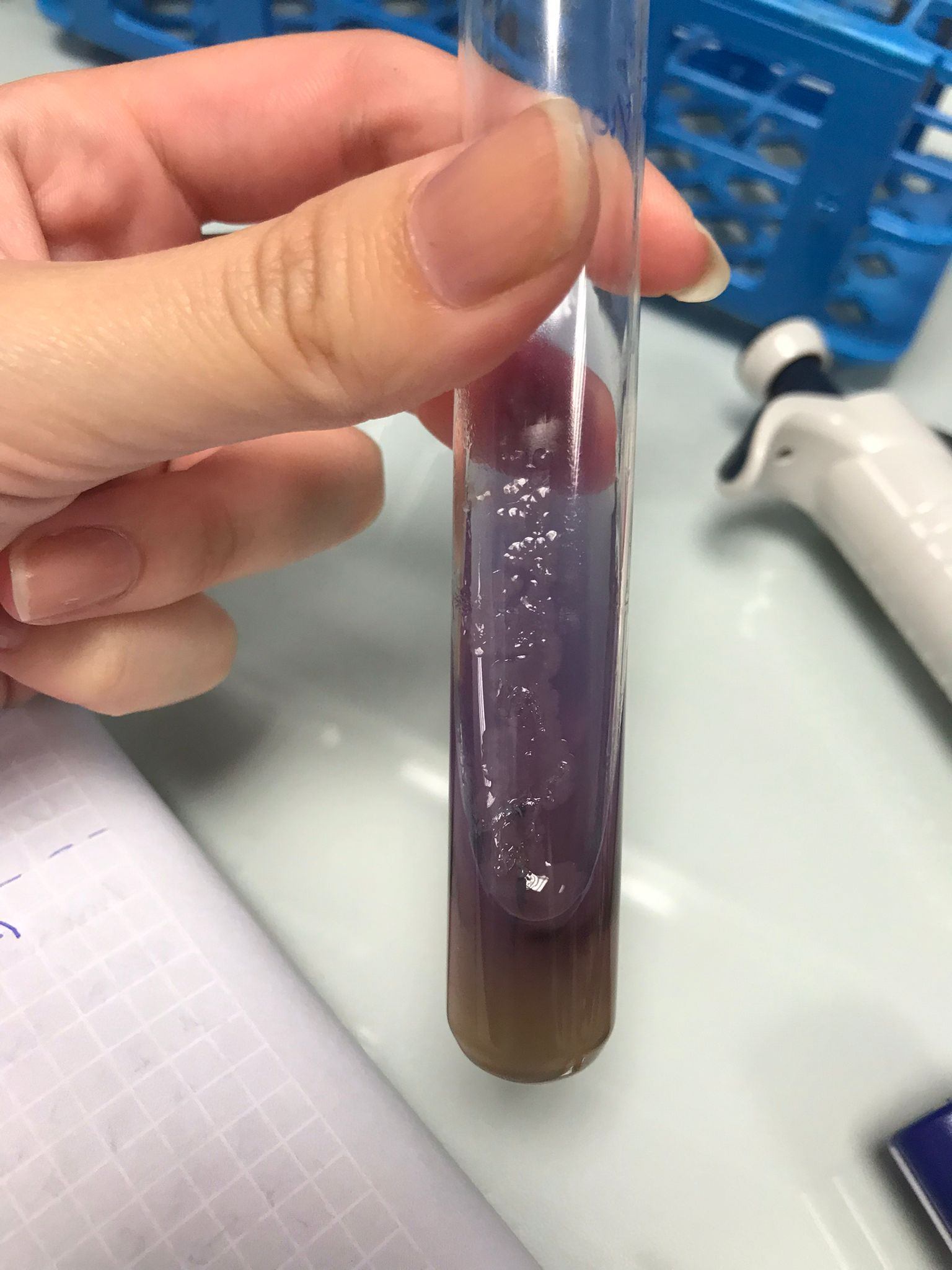
LIA used in test

Lysine iron agar or LIA is a differential media used to distinguish bacteria that are able to decarboxylate lysine and/or produce hydrogen sulfide from those that cannot. This test is particularly useful for distinguishing different Gram-negative bacilli—especially among the Enterobacteriaceae.

== Composition ==
A liter of lysine iron agar contains 13.5g of the gelling agent agar, as well as the nutrients lysine (10 g), pancreatic digest of gelatin (5 g), yeast extract (3 g), glucose (1 g), ferric ammonium citrate (0.5 g), and sodium thiosulfate pentahydrate (40 mg). Additionally, 20 mg of the indicator bromocresol purple is added.

== Use ==
Different types of bacteria can be differentiated on the agar by their color. Bacteria able to decarboxylate lysine will leave the media purple colored. Bacteria producing hydrogen sulfide will appear black.

A frequent test done with LIA agar is the LIA slant. Here the LIA is solidified at an angle, then inoculated with bacteria by stabbing the agar to within 1/4 inch of the bottom of the tube and streaking the slant. The slant is then incubated at 35 °C for 18–24 hours. The results are scored as follows:

- purple slant/yellow butt = LSI Negative
- turbid, purple butt = LSI Positive
- black precipitate = H_{2}S Positive
