= Vadim Backman =

American biomedical engineer

Vadim Backman is an American biomedical engineer and the Sachs Family Professor of biomedical engineering at the Robert R. McCormick School of Engineering and Applied Science at Northwestern University. He is also a Professor of Medicine (Hematology/Oncology) and Professor of Biochemistry and Molecular Genetics at Feinberg School of Medicine and is the Associate Director of Research Technology and Infrastructure and Program Leader in Cancer and Physical Sciences at Robert H. Lurie Comprehensive Cancer Center.

== Early life ==
Backman was born in the former USSR in 1973 and later emigrated with his family to the United States.

== Career ==
Backman received his M.S. in physics from the Massachusetts Institute of Technology (MIT), and a PhD in medical engineering and medical physics from Harvard University and MIT. In 2001, he joined Northwestern University's faculty.

Backman also serves as the Associate Director for Research Technology and Infrastructure at the Robert H. Lurie Comprehensive Cancer Center at Northwestern. He became an American Institute for Medical and Biological Engineering Fellow in 2010 and a senior member of The Optical Society Board of Directors in 2011.

He helped co-found four start-ups: Preora Diagnostics Inc., ASP Health Inc., Nanocytomics, and American BioOptics.

== Research ==
Since 2003, he has been working on strategies for early detection of cancer by looking for cell changes at a 20 to 50 nanometer scale. In 2019, his lab developed a tool that images blood flow in such a way to see capillaries more closely and measure things like oxygenation and metabolic rate. In 2020, he led a study that noted that countries with higher COVID-19 mortality rates also had higher levels of Vitamin D deficiency. In 2021, Backman published a paper in Science Advances about the construction of cells on a genomic level and how this impacts their ability to deal with external stressors.

== Personal life ==
Backman collaborates with and is married to civil and environmental engineer Luisa Marcelino.
