= Biomedical spectroscopy =

Multidisciplinary research field

Biomedical spectroscopy is a multidisciplinary research field involving spectroscopic tools for applications in the field of biomedical science. Vibrational spectroscopy such as Raman or infrared spectroscopy is used to determine the chemical composition of a material based on detection of vibrational modes of constituent molecules. Some spectroscopic methods are routinely used in clinical settings for diagnosis of disease; an example is Magnetic resonance imaging (MRI). Fourier transform infrared (FTIR) spectroscopic imaging is a form of chemical imaging for which the contrast is provided by composition of the material.
