= Quintuple bond =

Chemical bond involving ten bonding electrons

The structure of [CrC_{6}H_{3}-2,6-(C_{6}H_{3}-2,6-(CHMe_{2})_{2})_{2}]_{2}

A quintuple bond in chemistry is an unusual type of chemical bond, first reported in 2005 for a dichromium compound. Single bonds, double bonds, and triple bonds are commonplace in chemistry. Quadruple bonds are rarer and are currently known only among the transition metals, especially for Cr, Mo, W, and Re, e.g. [Mo_{2}Cl_{8}]^{4−} and [Re_{2}Cl_{8}]^{2−}. In a quintuple bond, ten electrons participate in bonding between the two metal centers, allocated as σ^{2}π^{4}δ^{4}.

In some cases of high-order bonds between metal atoms, the metal–metal bonding is facilitated by ligands that link the two metal centers and reduce the interatomic distance. By contrast, the chromium dimer with quintuple bonding is stabilized by a bulky terphenyl (2,6-[(2,6-diisopropyl)phenyl]phenyl) ligands. The species is stable up to 200 °C. The chromium–chromium quintuple bond has been analyzed with multireference ab initio and DFT methods, which were also used to elucidate the role of the terphenyl ligand, in which the flanking aryls were shown to interact very weakly with the chromium atoms, causing only a small weakening of the quintuple bond. A 2007 theoretical study identified two global minima for quintuple bonded RMMR compounds: a trans-bent molecular geometry and surprisingly another trans-bent geometry with the R substituent in a bridging position.

In 2005, a quintuple bond was postulated to exist in the hypothetical uranium molecule U_{2} based on computational chemistry. Diuranium compounds are rare, but do exist; for example, the U_{2}Cl^{2−}_{8} anion.

In 2007 the shortest-ever metal–metal bond (180.28 pm) was reported to exist also in a compound containing a quintuple chromium-chromium bond with diazadiene bridging ligands. Other metal–metal quintuple bond containing complexes that have been reported include quintuply bonded dichromium with [6-(2,4,6-triisopropylphenyl)pyridin-2-yl](2,4,6-trimethylphenyl)amine bridging ligands and a dichromium complex with amidinate bridging ligands.

Synthesis of quintuple bonds is usually achieved through reduction of a dimetal species using potassium graphite. This adds valence electrons to the metal centers, giving them the needed number of electrons to participate in quintuple bonding. Below is a figure of a typical quintuple bond synthesis.

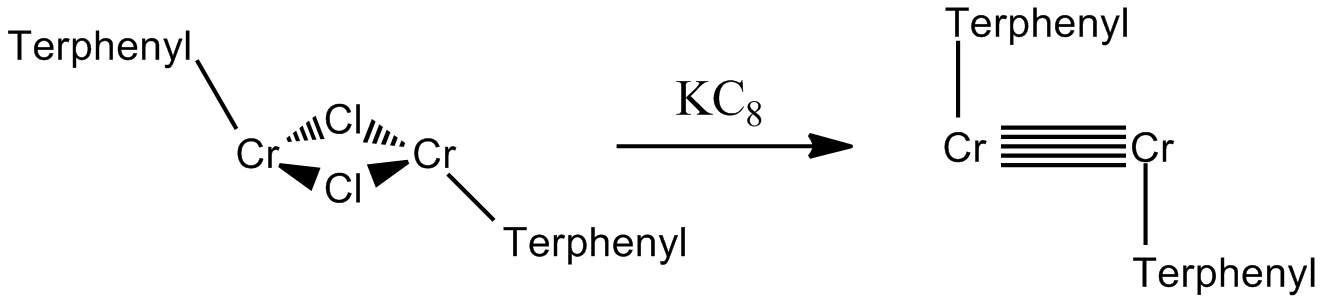
Cr–Cr quintuple bond synthesis

== Dimolybdenum quintuple bonds ==
In 2009 a dimolybdenum compound with a quintuple bond and two diamido bridging ligands was reported with a Mo–Mo bond length of 202 pm. The compound was synthesised starting from potassium octachlorodimolybdate (which already contains a Mo_{2} quadruple bond) and a lithium amidinate, followed by reduction with potassium graphite:

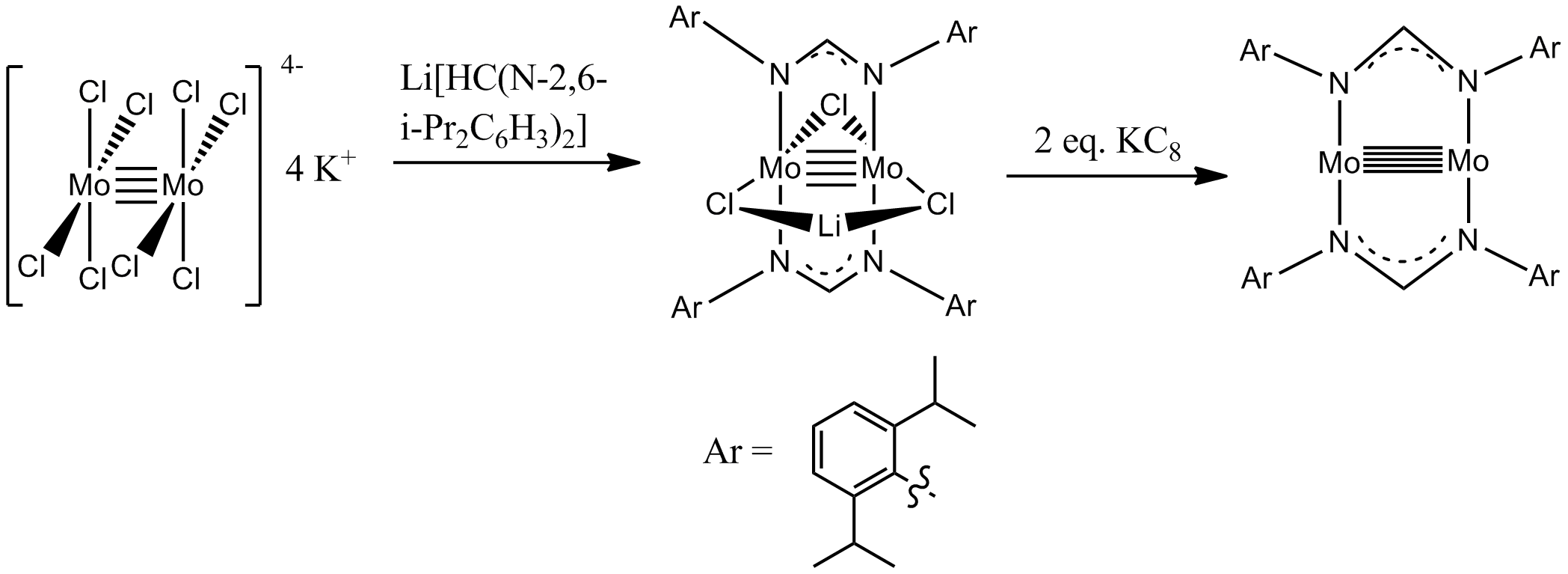
dimolybdenum quintuple bond synthesis

== Bonding ==
As stated above, metal–metal quintuple bonds have a σ^{2}π^{4}δ^{4} configuration. Among the five bonds present between the metal centers, one is a sigma bond, two are pi bonds, and two are delta bonds. The σ-bond is the result of mixing between the d_{z^{2}} orbital on each metal center. The first π-bond comes from mixing of the d_{yz} orbitals from each metal while the other π-bond comes from the d_{xz} orbitals on each metal mixing. Finally the δ-bonds come from mixing of the d_{xy} orbitals as well as mixing between the d_{x^{2}−y^{2}} orbitals from each metal.

Molecular orbital calculations have elucidated the relative energies of the orbitals created by these bonding interactions. As shown in the figure below, the lowest energy orbitals are the π bonding orbitals followed by the σ bonding orbital. The next highest are the δ bonding orbitals which represent the HOMO. Because the 10 valence electrons of the metals are used to fill these first 5 orbitals, the next highest orbital becomes the LUMO which is the δ* antibonding orbital. Though the π and δ orbitals are represented as being degenerate, they in fact are not. This is because the model shown here is a simplification and that hybridization of s, p, and d orbitals is believed to take place, causing a change in the orbital energy levels.

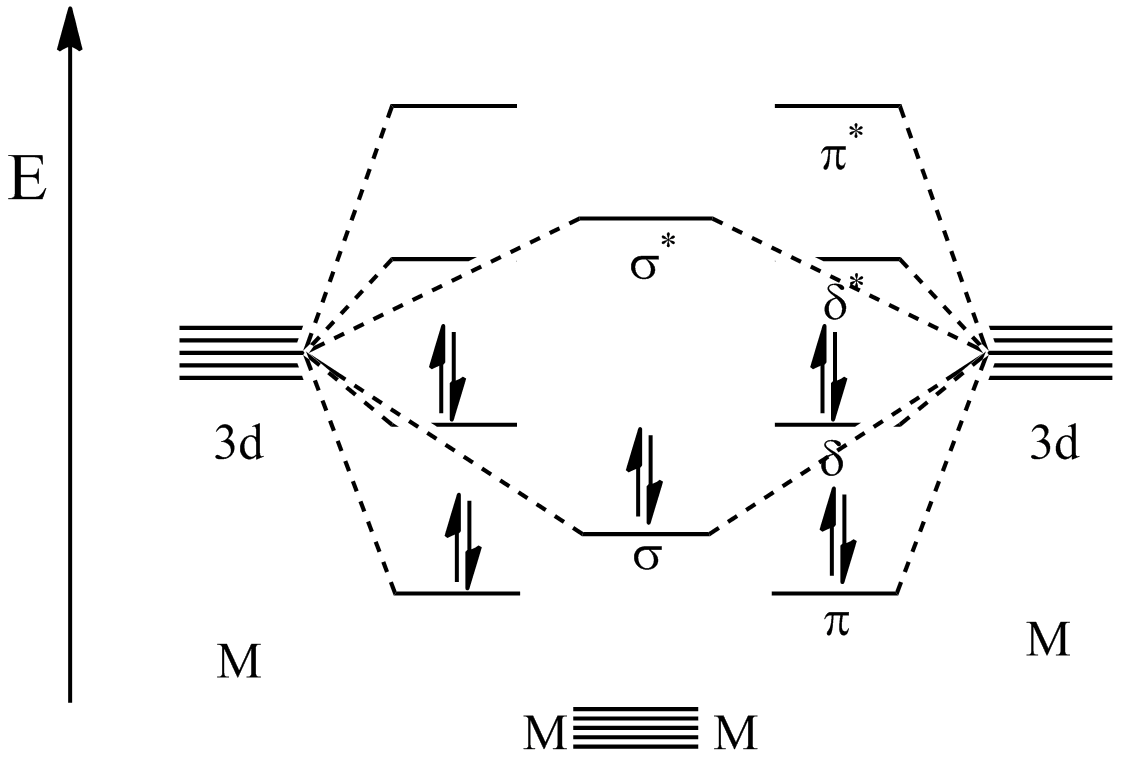
MO diagram of a metal–metal quintuple bond

== Ligand role in metal–metal quintuple bond length ==
Quintuple bond lengths are heavily dependent on the ligands bound to the metal centers. Nearly all complexes containing a metal–metal quintuple bond have bidentate bridging ligands, and even those that do not, such as the terphenyl complex mentioned earlier, have some bridging characteristic to it through metal–ipso-carbon interactions.

The bidentate ligand can act as a sort of tweezer in that in order for chelation to occur the metal atoms must move closer together, thereby shortening the quintuple bond length. The two ways in which to obtain shorter metal–metal distances is to either reduce the distance between the chelating atoms in the ligand by changing the structure, or by using steric effects to force a conformational change in the ligand that bends the molecule in a way that forces the chelating atoms closer together. An example of the latter is shown below:

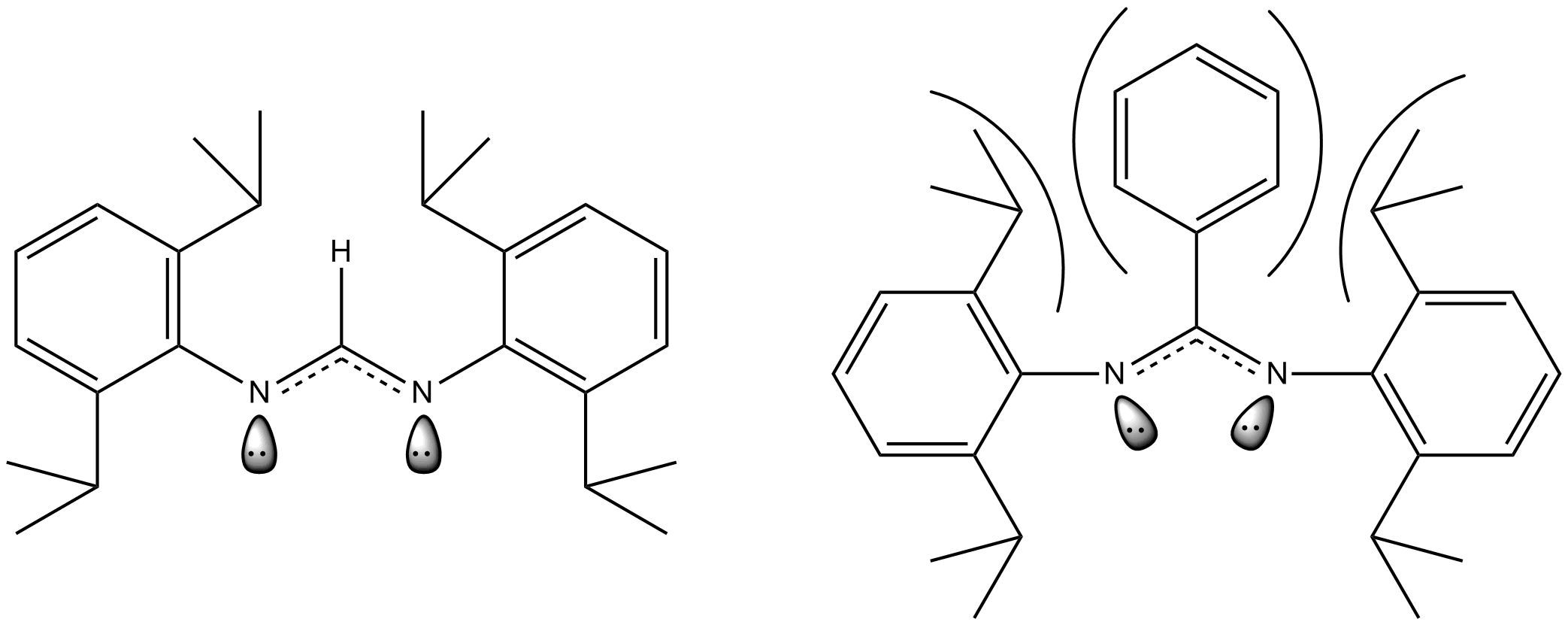
Steric effects on a bidentate ligand

The above example shows the ligand used in the dimolybdenum complex shown earlier. When the carbon between the two nitrogens in the ligand has a hydrogen bound to it, the steric repulsion is small. However, when the hydrogen is replaced with a much more bulky phenyl ring the steric repulsion increases dramatically and the ligand "bows" which causes a change in the orientation of the lone pairs of electrons on the nitrogen atoms. These lone pairs are what is responsible for forming bonds with the metal centers so forcing them to move closer together also forces the metal centers to be positioned closer together. Thus, decreasing the length of the quintuple bond. In the case where this ligand is bound to quintuply bonded dimolybdenum the quintuple bond length goes from 201.87 pm to 201.57 pm when the hydrogen in replaced with a phenyl group. Similar results have also been demonstrated in dichromium quintuple bond complexes as well.

== Reactions ==
One of the most well-characterized reactions of quintuple bonds is the [2+2] cycloaddition of alkynes across a Cr–Cr quintuple bond to produce substituted dimetallacyclobutenes, reducing the bond order of the quintuple and triple bonds down to quadruple and double respectively:

This produces a 4-membered Cr_{2}C_{2} metallacycle (a dimetallacyclobutene) containing a quadruple bond between Cr–Cr and a double bond between C–C.

== Research trends ==
Efforts continue to prepare shorter quintuple bonds.

Quintuple-bonded dichromium complexes appear to act like magnesium to produce Grignard reagents.
