= Principal interacting orbital =

Quantum chemistry concept

Principal interacting orbital (PIO), based on quantum chemical calculations, provides chemists with visualization of a set of semi-localized dominant interacting orbitals. The method offers additional perspective to molecular orbitals (MO) obtained from quantum chemical calculations (DFT for instance), which often provide extensively delocalized orbitals that are hard to interpret and relate with chemists' intuition on electronic structures and orbital interactions. Several other efforts have been made to help visualize semi-localized dominant interacting orbitals that represents well chemists' intuition, while maintaining the mathematical rigorosity. Notable examples include the natural atomic orbitals (NAO), natural bond orbitals (NBO), charge decomposition analysis (CDA), and adaptive natural density partitioning (AdNDP). PIO analysis uniquely provides semi-localized MOs that are chemically accurate (i.e., not always produces 2-center-2-electron localized orbitals, continuous evolution of PIOs along potential energy surface, etc.) and easy to interpret.

== General workflow ==
A typical workflow is summarized here. For details, please refer to the reference or consult the website.

1. Optimize structure and calculate electronic structure.
2. Run NBO analysis to obtain the NAO basis and corresponding density matrix.
3. Run PIO analysis.

== Mathematical details ==
The PIO analysis is based on the statistical method principal component analysis (PCA).

== Chemical examples ==
=== Diels-Alder reaction ===
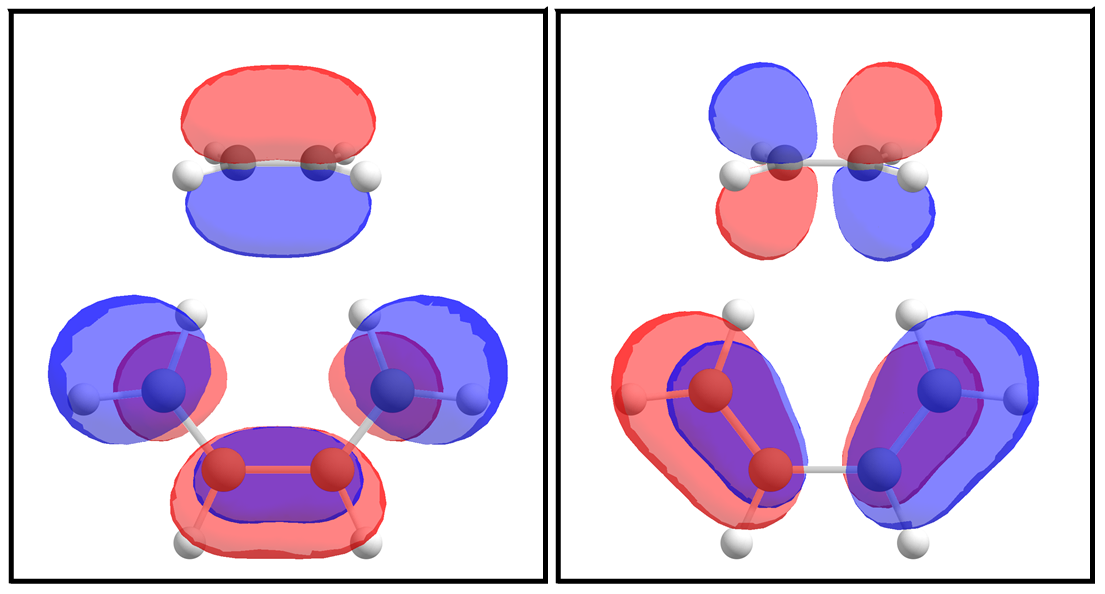
The frontier molecular orbitals in a Diels Alder reaction

==== Ethylene and hexadeca-1,3,5,7,9,11,13,15-octaene ====
The Diels-Alder reaction of hexadeca-1,3,5,7,9,11,13,15-octaene and ethylene can be thought of as a [4+2] reaction between a substituted diene and a dienophile. The frontier molecular orbitals produced by a typical structural optimization are as follows: the HOMO and LUMO of the dienophile "ethylene" are two-centered, while the HOMO and the LUMO of the substituted diene "hexadeca-1,3,5,7,9,11,13,15-octaene" are delocalized over the entire molecule.

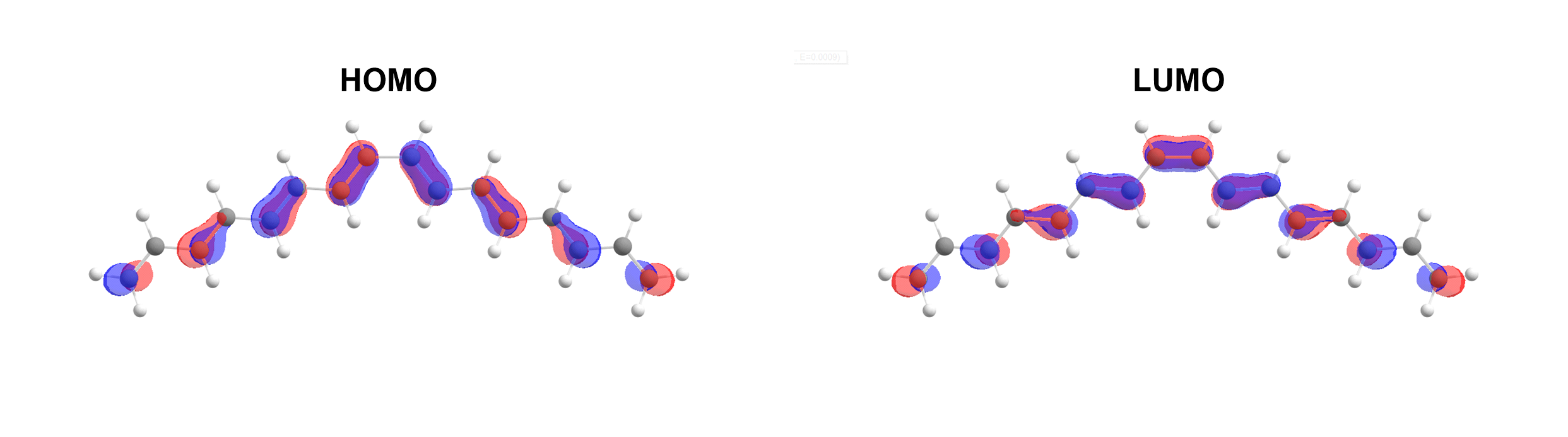
The frontier molecular orbitals of a complex DA reaction

This is different from chemists' traditional depiction of the Diels-Alder reaction: the HOMO (two-centered) of the dienophile interacts with the LUMO of the diene (four-centered), and the LUMO (two-centered) of the dienophile interacts with the HOMO of the diene (four-centered).

The computed delocalized HOMO and LUMO in hexadeca-1,3,5,7,9,11,13,15-octaene makes it hard for chemists to make useful interpretations.

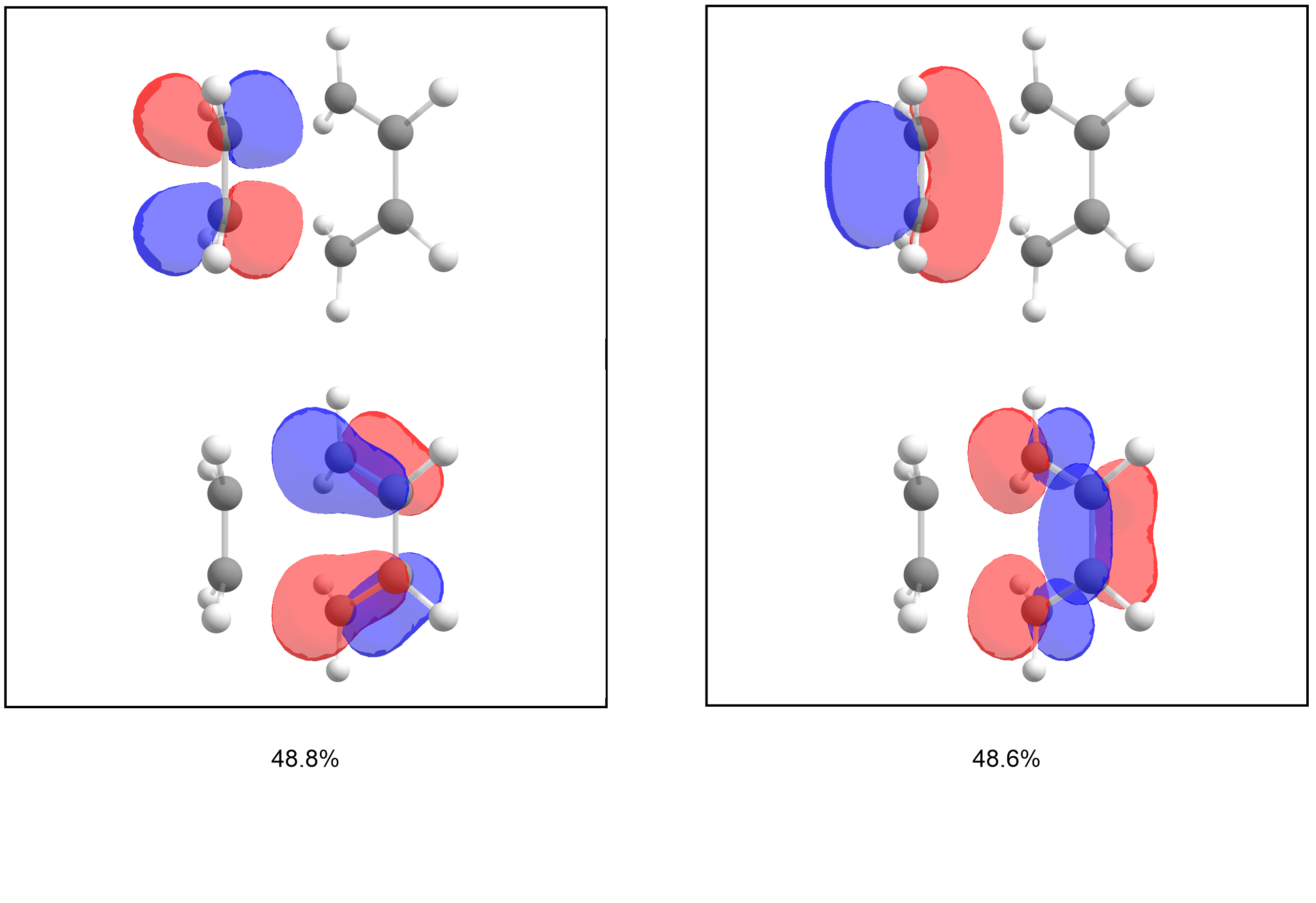
Principal Interacting Orbitals in the TS of a DA reaction

On the other hand, the dominant PIOs from PIO analysis resemble the HOMO/LUMO (four-centered) of an unsubstituted butadiene. This highlights an advantage of PIO calculation—it localizes the orbitals to the reactive part and preserves the multi-centered feature. Another feature of PIO calculation that must be highlighted is that the first two principal orbital interactions—which resembles the interaction of the HOMO of the diene and the LUMO of the dienophile, and the interaction of the LUMO of the diene and the HOMO of the dienophile—sums to over 95% of the total orbital interaction between the two fragments.

==== Reaction coordinate tracing ====
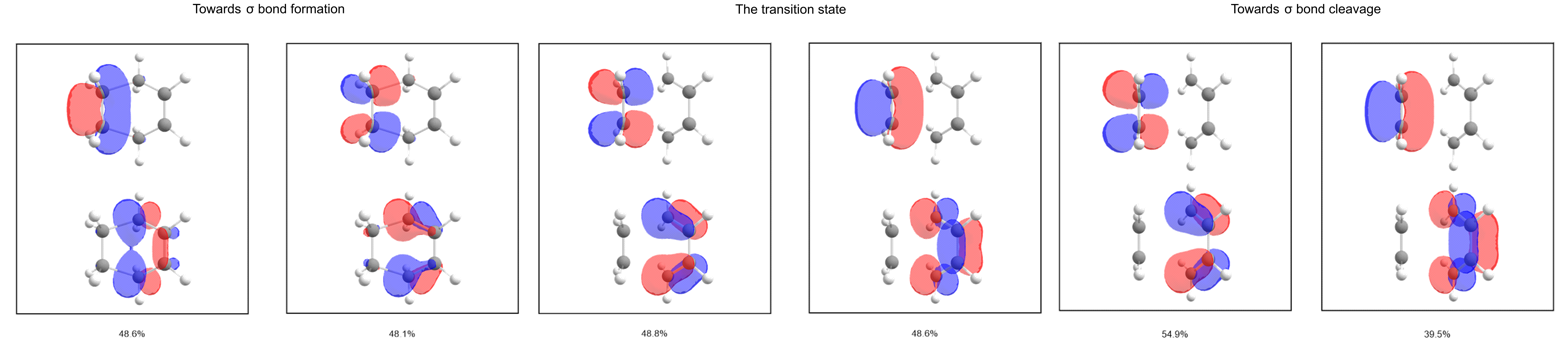
PIOs on the intrinsic reaction coordinate of a DA reaction

PIO analysis with intrinsic reaction coordinate (IRC) calculation gives continuous results. The continuality extends to the evolution of the shape of the PIOs and their percentage of contribution to the overall orbital interaction. This is another advantage of PIO analysis over other methods to obtain localized electronic structures such as NBO and AdNDP. The other methods require predefined parameters and often lead to ambiguous chemical structures and unphysical discontinuity. For instance, when the Diels-Alder reaction is analyzed with IRC and NBO, (1) the orbitals on the diene are described as two-center-two-electron bonds, and (2) the result is not continuous—three pi bonds would suddenly switch to three newly formed bonds. Further, PIO tracing of reaction coordinate can reveal other properties such as the electronic demand of a Diels-Alder reaction. For a normal demand DA reaction (EDG on diene and EWG on dienophile), PIO analysis shows that the reaction is dominated with contribution from the HOMO of the diene and the LUMO of the dienophile. For a reverse demand DA (EWG on diene and EDG on dienophile), PIO analysis shows that the reaction is dominated with contribution from the LUMO of the diene and the HOMO of the dienophile. On the other hand, for a neutral demand DA, contributions from the diene-HOMO/dienophile-LUMO and diene-LUMO/dienophile-HOMO are roughly equal.

=== Zeise's salt ===
PIO can also be used to describe transition metal compounds, which are often more complicated to analyze than main group compounds due to more possible bonding patterns. A classic example is Zeise's salt, which is usually described with the Dewar-Chatt-Duncanson (DCD) model. C_{2}H_{4} donates its pi electrons to the empty orbital of Pt, while its π* orbital accepts electrons from Pt. The semilocalized bonding cannot be adequately described with methods such as NBO (localized two-center-two-electron) and CMO (delocalized over the entire molecule). On the other hand, PIO analysis produces a model that is in best agreement with our chemical intuition. The top two PIOs sums to over 90% of the overall orbital contribution. The first PIO pair is between the d_{z2} orbital of the metal and the pi orbital of ethylene. The second PIO pair is between the d_{xz} orbital of the metal and the π* orbital of ethylene.

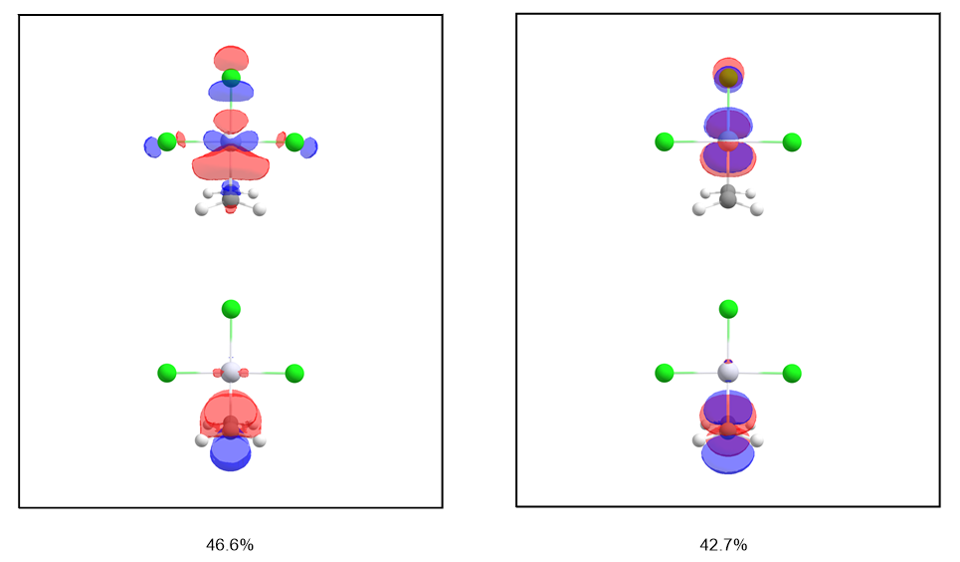
Principal interacting orbitals in the Zeise's salt.

=== [Re_{2}Cl_{8}]^{2-} ===
PIO analysis of [Re_{2}Cl_{8}]^{2-} four primary orbital interactions, which corresponds to the quadruple bond (one σ, two π, and one δ).

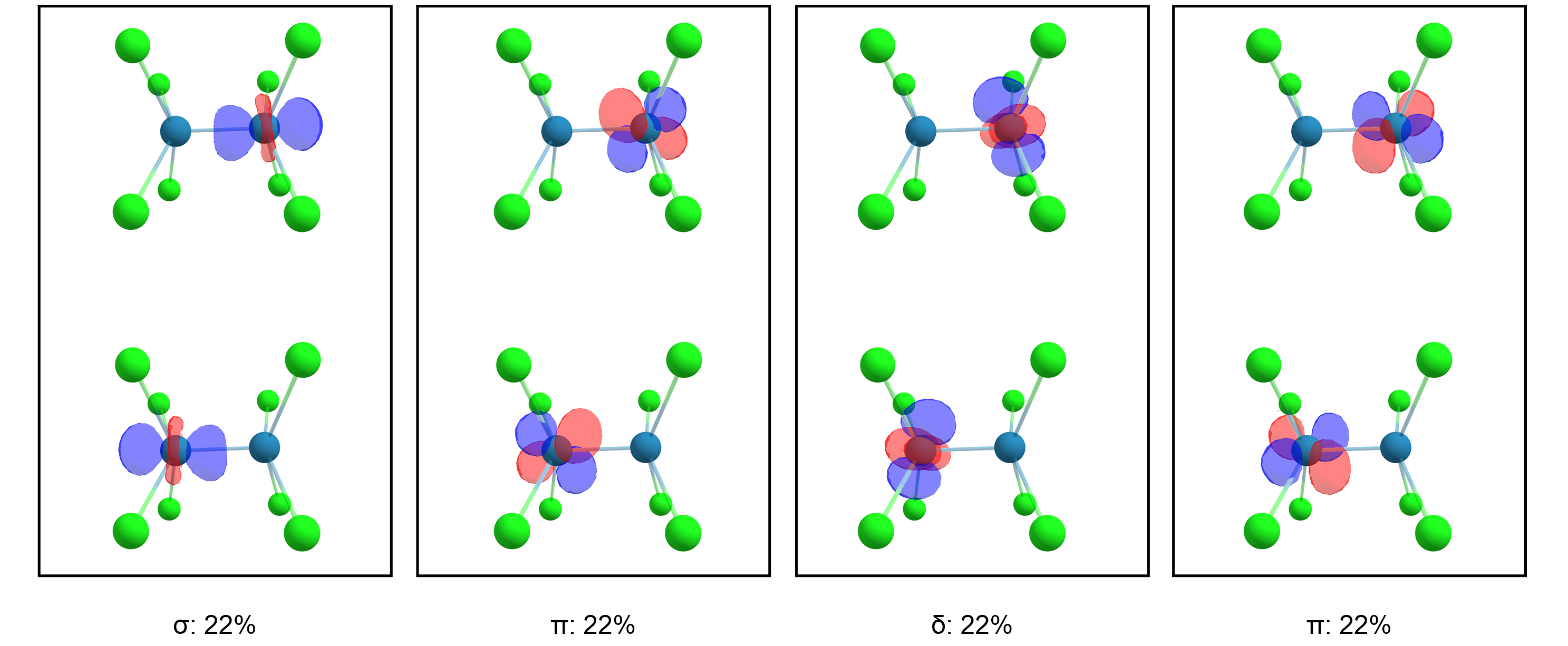
Principal interacting orbitals in Re_{2}Cl_{9}^{2-}
