= Ditungsten tetra(hpp) =

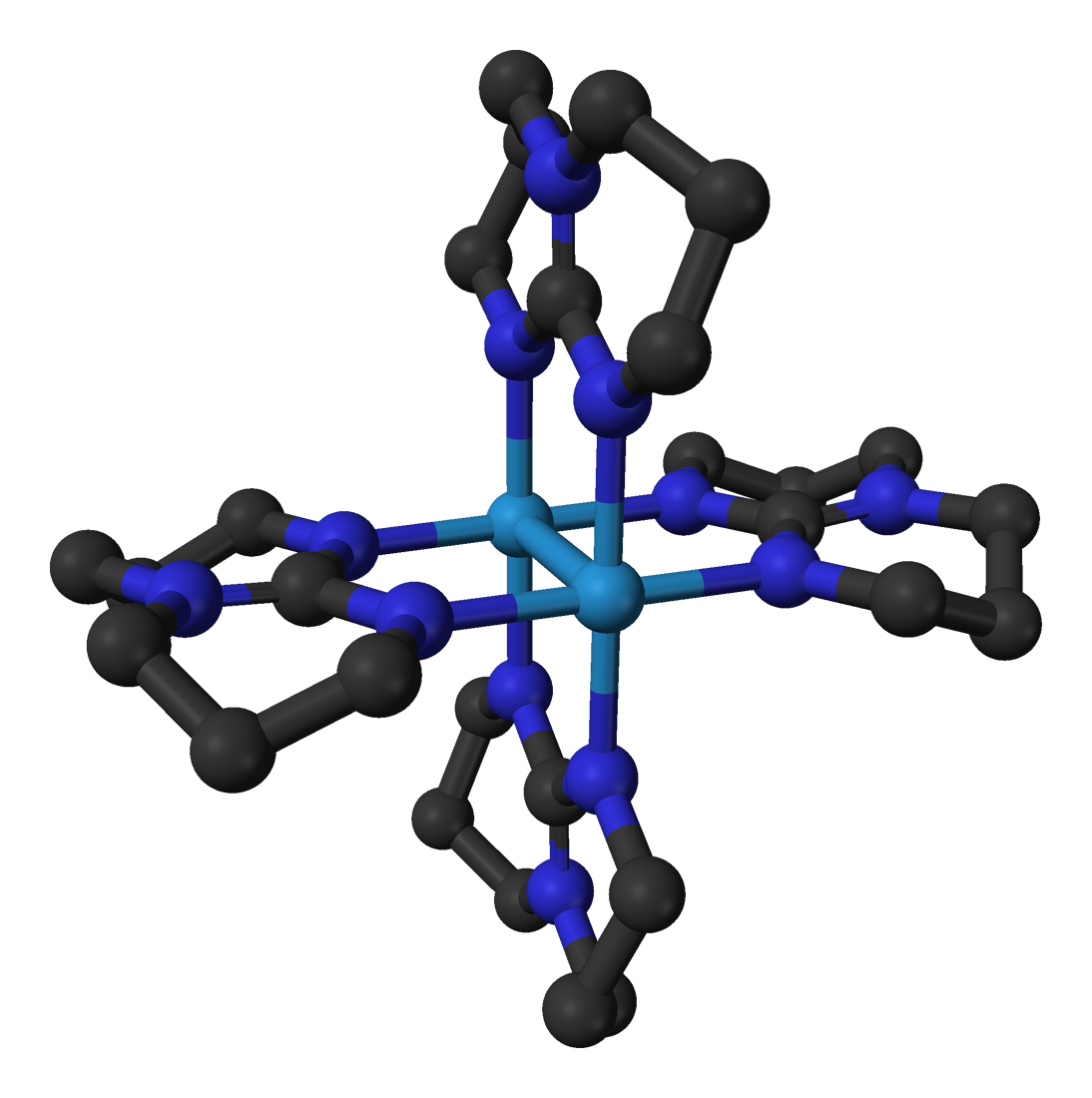

Names
- IUPAC name Tetrakis(hexahydropyrimidinopyrimidine)ditungsten(II)

Identifiers
CAS Number	463931-34-2
3D model (JSmol)	Interactive image
- InChI: InChI=1S/4C7H12N3.2W/c4*1-3-8-7-9-4-2-6-10(7)5-1;;/h4*1-6H2;;/q4*-1;2*+2 Key: QHDLVDGBBXEACA-UHFFFAOYSA-N
- SMILES: [W+2]$[W+2].N\2=C1/[N-]CCCN1CCC/2.N\2=C1/[N-]CCCN1CCC/2.N\2=C1/[N-]CCCN1CCC/2.N\2=C1/[N-]CCCN1CCC/2

Properties
Chemical formula	C_{28}H_{48}N_{12}W_{2}
Molar mass	920.46 g·mol^{−1}
- Except where otherwise noted, data are given for materials in their standard state (at 25 °C [77 °F], 100 kPa). verify (what is ?) Infobox references

Tetrakis(hexahydropyrimidinopyrimidine)ditungsten(II), known as ditungsten tetra(hpp), is the name of the coordination compound with the formula W_{2}(hpp)_{4}. This material consists of a pair of tungsten centers linked by the conjugate base of four hexahydropyrimidopyrimidine (hpp) ligands. It adopts a structure sometimes called a Chinese lantern structure or paddlewheel compound, the prototype being copper(II) acetate.

The hpp ligand anion

The molecule is of research interest because it has the lowest ionization energy (3.51 eV) of all stable chemical elements or chemical compounds as of the year 2005. This value is even lower than of caesium with 3.89 eV (or 375 kJ/mol) located at the extreme left lower corner of the periodic table (although francium is at a lower position in the periodic table compared to caesium, it has a higher ionization energy and is radioactive) or known metallocene reducing agents such as decamethylcobaltocene with 4.71 eV.

== Preparation ==
This coordination compound is prepared by the reaction of tungsten hexacarbonyl with 1,3,4,6,7,8-hexahydro-2H-pyrimido[1,2-a]pyrimidine (Hhpp) in o-dichlorobenzene at 200 °C:

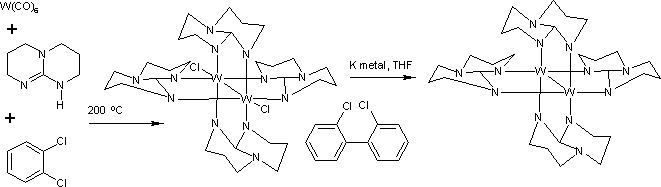
Synthesis of ditungsten tetra(hpp)

The reaction gives W_{2}(hpp)_{4}Cl_{2}. Dichlorobenzene provides the chlorine atoms and is itself reductively coupled to 2,2′-dichlorobiphenyl. The bond order between the tungsten centers in W_{2}(hpp)_{4}Cl_{2} is three.

This dichloride is further reduced by potassium metal to W_{2}(hpp)_{4}. This species has a quadruple bond between the two tungsten centers. Related quadruply bonded complexes include [W_{2}Cl_{8}]^{4−} and [Mo_{2}Cl_{8}]^{4−}. Because of its low ionization energy, W_{2}(hpp)_{4} is easily oxidized back to the dichloride by dichloromethane. It is readily oxidized to the corresponding cation with the oxidants fullerene and with tetracyanoquinodimethane.
