= Pi electron donor-acceptor =

The pEDA parameter (pi electron donor-acceptor) is a pi-electron substituent effect scale, described also as mesomeric or resonance effect. There is also a complementary scale - sEDA. The more positive is the value of pEDA the more pi-electron donating is a substituent. The more negative pEDA, the more pi-electron withdrawing is the substituent (see the table below).

The pEDA parameter for a given substituent is calculated by means of quantum chemistry methods. The model molecule is the monosubstituted benzene. First the geometry should be optimized at a suitable model of theory, then the natural population analysis within the framework of Natural Bond Orbital theory is performed. The molecule have to be oriented in such a way that the aromatic benzene ring is perpendicular to the z-axis. Then, the 2p_{z} orbital occupations of ring carbon atoms are summed up to give the total pi- occupation. From this value the sum of pi-occupation for unsubstituted benzene (value close to 6 in accord to Huckel rule) is subtracted resulting in original pEDA parameter. For pi-electron donating substituents like -NH_{2}, OH or -F the pEDA parameter is positive, and for pi-electron withdrawing substituents like -NO_{2}, -BH_{2} or -CN the pEDA is negative.

The pEDA scale was invented by Wojciech P. Oziminski and Jan Cz. Dobrowolski and the details are available in the original paper.

The pEDA scale linearly correlates with experimental substituent constants like Taft-Topsom σR parameter.

For easy calculation of pEDA the free of charge for academic purposes written in Tcl program with graphical user interface AromaTcl is available.

Sums of pi-electron occupations and pEDA parameter for substituents of various character are gathered in the following table:

R	π-total	pEDA
-CH_{2}^{−}	6.562	0.571
-NH^{−}	6.481	0.491
-O^{−}	6.387	0.397
-NH_{2}	6.136	0.145
-OH	6.112	0.121
-F	6.069	0.078
-Cl	6.053	0.062
-Br	6.047	0.057
-CH_{3}	6.005	0.014
-H	5.991	0.000
-NH_{3}^{+}	5.984	-0.007
-SiH_{3}	5.974	-0.017
-Li	5.971	-0.020
-CF_{3}	5.967	-0.024
-CN	5.955	-0.035
-CONH_{2}	5.947	-0.044
-BeH	5.938	-0.052
-COOH	5.923	-0.068
-NO_{2}	5.922	-0.069
-BF_{2}	5.914	-0.077
-CFO	5.910	-0.081
-CHO	5.903	-0.087
-COCN	5.874	-0.117
-NO	5.861	-0.129
-BH_{2}	5.849	-0.142
-N_{2}^{+}	5.764	-0.227
-CH_{2}^{+}	5.380	-0.611
