= Second-order Jahn-Teller distortion in main-group element compounds =

Model to predict the geometry of molecules

Second-order Jahn-Teller distortion (commonly known as pseudo Jahn-Teller distortion) is a singular, general, and powerful approach rigorously based in first-principle vibronic coupling interactions. It enables prediction and explication of molecular geometries that are not necessarily satisfactorily or even correctly explained by semi-empirical theories such as Walsh diagrams, atomic state hybridization, valence shell electron pair repulsion (VSEPR), softness-hardness-based models, aromaticity and antiaromaticity, hyperconjugation, etc.

The application to main-group element compounds utilizes principles of group theory and symmetry. A molecule will distort in order to maximize symmetry-allowed interactions between the highest occupied molecular orbitals and lowest unoccupied molecular orbitals, and thereby stabilize the HOMOs and destabilize the LUMOs (resulting in the overall stabilization of the molecule). The extent of second-order Jahn-Teller distortion is inversely proportional to the energy difference between orbitals. Direct products are used to determine the allowedness of a given interaction: the interaction is allowed if the product of the symmetry of the first molecular orbital, the symmetry of the vibration, and the symmetry of the second molecular orbital contains the totally symmetric irreducible representation of the molecule’s point group. For heavier main-group compounds, molecular orbital interactions are larger due to the decreasing bond strength resulting in a smaller energy difference between the interacting orbitals.

== Geometries of heavier group 13 and 14 analogues of multiply bound species ==
Group 14 analogues of alkenes and alkynes have previously been prepared. Moving down the group, the compounds experience increasing geometric distortion, becoming increasingly trans-bent from the original linear geometry and displaying increasingly limited shortening of the multiple bond. These patterns are also observed in group 13 multiply-bonded compounds. These geometry trends are rationalized below.

=== Semiempirical approaches ===
==== Hybridization ====
This trend can be rationalized with hybridization – moving down a group, the gap between the ns and np orbitals widens and there is an increasing mismatch between valence orbital sizes. The mismatch leads to lower hybridization – that is, increased nonbonding character on each of the heavier group 13 or 14 atoms involved in multiple bonding, which manifests as increased deviation from the typically expected linear and planar geometries. This rationalization is not especially cohesive with the typical approach to multiple bonds in organic chemistry – that is, a single σ-bond and one or two π-bonds.

==== Double donor-acceptor bonding ====
This rationalization is simple and preserves the double-bond nature of the group 13 or 14 atom interaction. The multiple bond is not exactly a typical σ+π interaction; rather the two halves of the alkyne analogue are treated as singlet bent monomers and the multiple bond is treated as an aggregation between them, with the sp_{x}p_{y}-hybridized filled orbital on one group 13 or 14 atom donating to the vacant p_{z} of the other.

==== Valence bond resonating lone pair ====
This rationalization is consistent with valence bond theory and suggests a weakened E-E multiple bond. The electron pair is described as resonating between the two group 13 or 14 atoms, and the resonance is favored by occupation of the empty (but not mandatorily vacant) orbital.

=== Second-order Jahn-Teller distortion approach ===
Second-order Jahn-Teller distortion provides a rigorous and first-principles approach to the distortion problem. The interactions between the HOMOs and LUMOs to afford a new set of molecular orbitals is an example of second-order Jahn-Teller distortion.

==== Cis- and trans-pyramidalization of alkene analogues ====
The trans-pyramidalization distortion is taken as an example. The frontier molecular orbitals of the undistorted alkene possessing D_{2h} symmetry have symmetries a_{g} (HOMO-1), b_{2u} (HOMO), b_{1g} (LUMO), and b_{3u} (LUMO+1). The symmetry of the trans-pyramidalization vibration is b_{1g}. A triple product of ground state, vibrational mode, and excited state that can be taken is b_{2u} (HOMO) x b_{1g} (trans-pyramidalizing vibrational mode) x b_{3u} (LUMO+1) = a_{1g}. Since a_{1g} is the totally symmetric representation, the b_{2u} and b_{3u} molecular orbitals participate in an allowed interaction through the trans-pyramidalizing vibrational mode. The molecule will distort in a trans-pyramidal fashion (into C_{2h} symmetry) in order to enable this interaction, which produces a more stabilized HOMO and more destabilized LUMO.

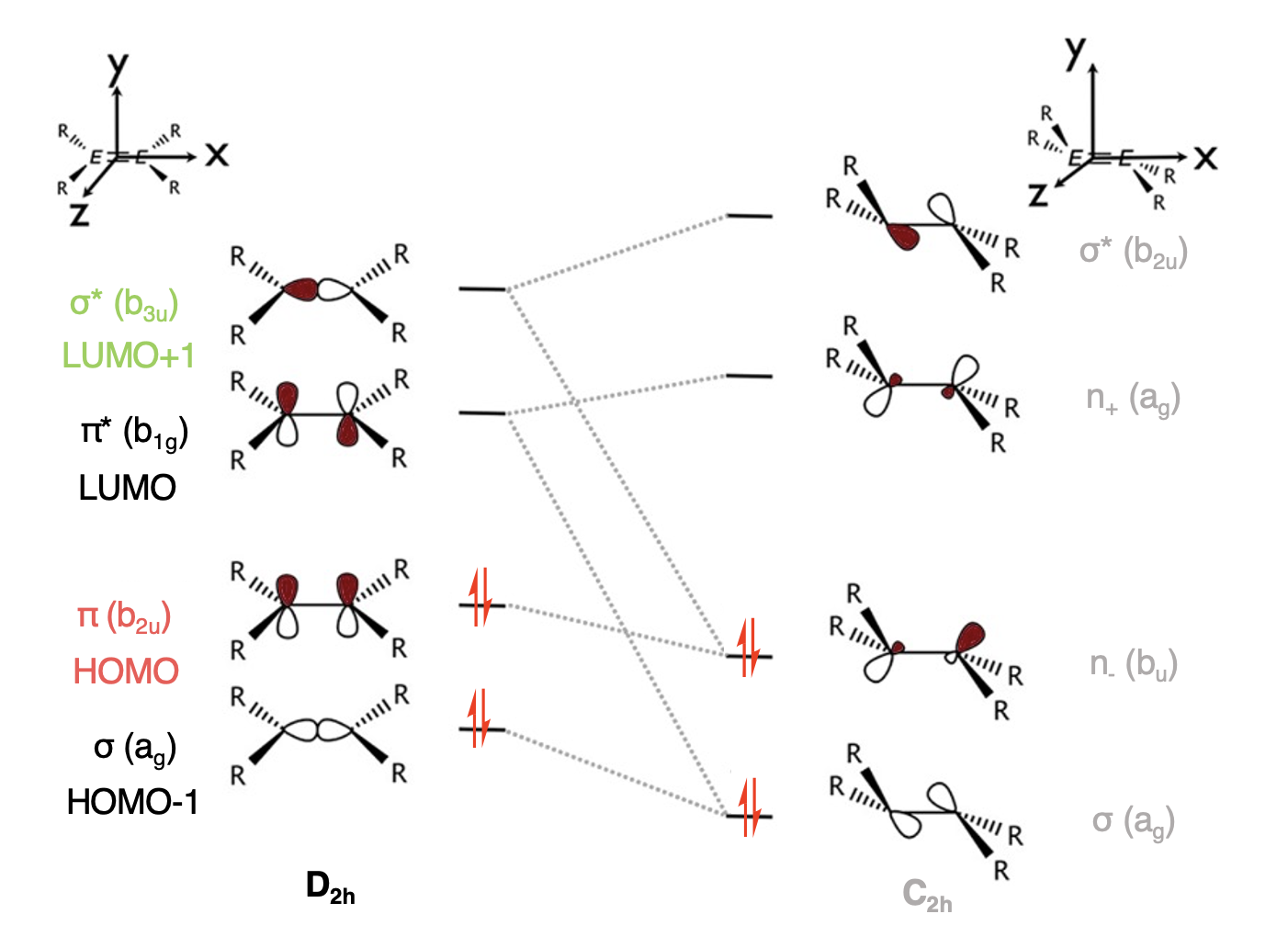
MO diagram of the trans-pyramidalization of heavier analogues of alkenes.

This treatment can be repeated for all other combinations of HOMO-1, HOMO and LUMO, LUMO+1. Notably, it is found that the HOMO and LUMO are symmetry-disallowed to mix.

==== Cis- and trans-bending of alkyne analogues ====
This distortion can be treated in the same fashion, using the triple product to determine whether or not the distortion from the undistorted linear D_{∞h} symmetry will produce a symmetry-allowed interaction (and therefore, whether or not the distortion will occur).

== Pyramidalization and inversion of trivalent group 15 compounds and group 14 radicals ==
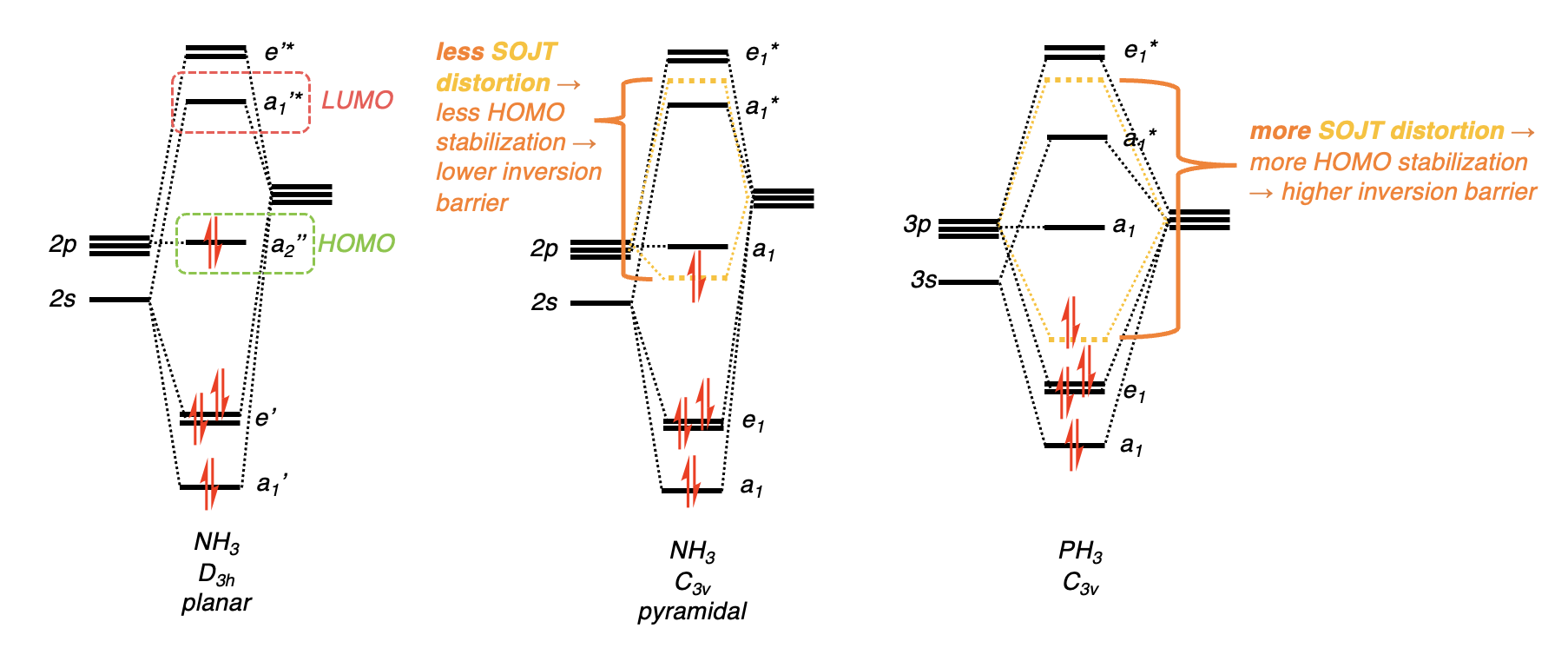
Rationalization of the inversion barriers of NH_{3} and PH_{3}.

The pyramidalization and energies of inversion of group 15 :MR_{3} (M = N, P, As, Sb, Bi) and group 14 •MR_{3} molecules can also be predicted and rationalized using a second-order Jahn-Teller distortion treatment. The “parent” planar molecule possessing D_{3h} symmetry has frontier orbitals of a_{2}” (HOMO) and a_{1}’ (LUMO) symmetries. The pyramidalizing vibration mode has symmetry a_{2}”. The triple product yields the totally symmetric representation a_{1}’, indicating that the molecule will indeed pyramidalize into C_{3v} symmetry.

The energies of inversion can also be predicted and compared. Due to lower energy overlap between the 3p and 3s orbitals in PH_{3} (versus between 2p and 3s in NH_{3}), the HOMO-LUMO energy gap in PH_{3} will be smaller than that of NH_{3}. This allows for a stronger interaction between the HOMO and LUMO in second-order Jahn-Teller fashion. The distortion stabilizes the HOMO and destabilizes the LUMO, resulting in a larger barrier to inversion in PH_{3}.

== Tetrahedral geometry of tetravalent second- and third-row main-group-element hydrides ==
Tetravalent main-group-element hydrides of form A^{P}H_{4} (A^{P} = B^{−}, C, N^{+}, O^{2+}, Al^{−}, Si, P^{+}, and S^{2+}, where A^{P} is a tetravalent atom or ion) are known to distort from the square planar to tetrahedral geometry. For all A^{P}H_{4} systems in D_{4h} symmetry, the ground state is a_{1g}. The exact electronic configuration, however, is dependent on the electronegativity of the main group element. The distortion to tetrahedral geometry has b_{2u} symmetry. For these A^{P}H_{4} systems, the a_{2u}→b_{1g}^{*} and e_{u}→e_{g}^{*} one-electron charge-transfer transitions are most active in the b_{2u} mode.
