= Electromeric effect =

Chemical polarization due to intramolecular electron displacement

In chemistry, the electromeric effect is a molecular polarization occurring by an intramolecular electron displacement, characterized by the substitution of one electron pair for another within the same atomic octet of electrons. It is sometimes called the conjugative mechanism, and previously, the tautomeric mechanism. The electromeric effect is often considered along with the inductive effect as types of electron displacement. Although some people refer to it as an effect produced by the presence of a reagent like an electrophile or a nucleophile, IUPAC does not define it as such. The term electromeric effect is no longer used in standard texts and is considered as obsolete. The concepts implied by the terms electromeric effect and mesomeric effect are absorbed in the term resonance effect. This effect can be represented using curved arrows, which symbolize the electron shift, as in the diagram below:

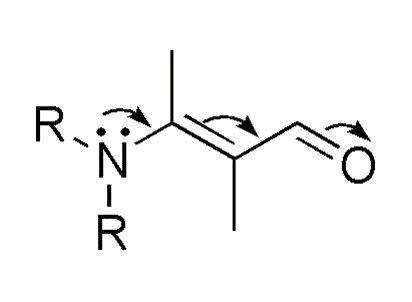

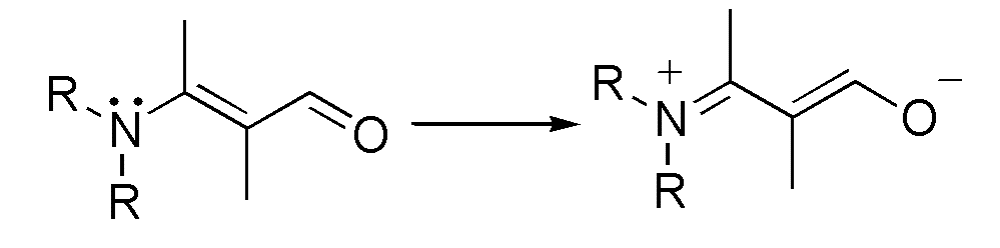

== Types of electromeric effects ==
Some websites, wrongly talks about electrometric effect as an electron shift caused by an approaching nucleophile or electrophile. In that case, one can imagine +E and -E effects, However, according to IUPAC definition electromeric effect is an molecular polarization caused by intramolecular electron displacement, but not caused by any external moiety. So the classification of electromeric effect in to +E and -E is not valid as it requires an attacking reagent, i.e. an electrophile or a nucleophile.

== Conclusion ==
According to IUPAC reference, the term electromeric effect "has been deemed obsolescent or even obsolete". It is not accurate to depict it as a polarization effect caused by electrophile or nucleophile.
