= Sigma electron donor-acceptor =

The sEDA parameter (sigma electron donor-acceptor) is a sigma-electron substituent effect scale, described also as inductive and electronegativity related effect. There is also a complementary scale - pEDA. The more positive is the value of sEDA the more sigma-electron donating is a substituent. The more negative sEDA, the more sigma-electron withdrawing is the substituent (see the table below).

The sEDA parameter for a given substituent is calculated by means of quantum chemistry methods. The model molecule is the monosubstituted benzene. First the geometry should be optimized at a suitable model of theory, then the natural population analysis within the framework of Natural Bond Orbital theory is performed. The molecule have to be oriented in such a way that the aromatic benzene ring lays in the xy plane and is perpendicular to the z-axis. Then, the 2s, 2p_{x} and 2py orbital occupations of ring carbon atoms are summed up to give the total sigma system occupation. From this value the sum of sigma-occupation for unsubstituted benzene is subtracted resulting in original sEDA parameter. For sigma-electron donating substituents like -Li, -BH_{2}, -SiH_{3}, the sEDA parameter is positive, and for sigma-electron withdrawing substituents like -F, -OH, -NH_{2}, -NO_{2}, -COOH the sEDA is negative.

The sEDA scale was invented by Wojciech P. Oziminski and Jan Cz. Dobrowolski and the details are available in the original paper.

The sEDA scale linearly correlates with experimental substituent constants like Taft-Topsom σR parameter.

For easy calculation of sEDA the free of charge for academic purposes written in Tcl program with graphical user interface AromaTcl is available.

Sums of sigma-electron occupations and sEDA parameter for substituents of various character are gathered in the following table:

R	σ-total	sEDA
-Li	19.826	0.460
-BeH	19.762	0.396
-BF_{2}	19.559	0.193
-SiH_{3}	19.550	0.184
-BH_{2}	19.539	0.173
-CH_{2}^{+}	19.406	0.040
-H	19.366	0.000
-CFO	19.278	-0.088
-CHO	19.264	-0.102
-COOH	19.256	-0.110
-COCN	19.247	-0.119
-CF_{3}	19.237	-0.130
-CONH_{2}	19.226	-0.140
-CN	19.207	-0.159
-Br	19.169	-0.197
-CH_{3}	19.137	-0.229
-NO	19.102	-0.264
-Cl	19.102	-0.264
-NO_{2}	19.046	-0.320
-N_{2}^{+}	19.034	-0.332
-CH_{2}^{−}	18.964	-0.402
-NH_{3}^{+}	18.950	-0.416
-NH_{2}	18.915	-0.451
-NH^{−}	18.825	-0.541
-OH	18.805	-0.561
-F	18.745	-0.621
-O^{−}	18.735	-0.631
