= Baker–Nathan effect =

Anomaly in chemical reactivity of certain organic molecules

In organic chemistry, the Baker–Nathan effect is observed with reaction rates for certain chemical reactions with certain substrates where the order in reactivity cannot be explained solely by an inductive effect of substituents.

This effect was described in 1935 by John W. Baker and W. S. Nathan. They examined the chemical kinetics for the reaction of pyridine with benzyl bromide to form a pyridinium salt, and a series of benzyl bromides having different alkyl groups as substituents at the para position.

The reaction is facilitated by electron-releasing substituents (the inductive effect) and in general the observed order (with decreasing reactivity) is tert-butyl > isopropyl > ethyl > methyl. The observed order in this particular reaction however was methyl > ethyl > isopropyl > tert-butyl. In 1935 Baker and Nathan explained the observed difference in terms of a conjugation effect and in later years after the advent of hyperconjugation (1939) as its predecessor.

A fundamental problem with the effect is that differences in the observed order are relatively small and therefore difficult to measure accurately. Other researchers have found similar results or very different results. An alternative explanation for the effect is differential solvation as orders invert on going from the solution phase to the gas phase.

Today, the conjugation of neighbouring pi orbitals and polarised sigma bonds is known as hyperconjugation. Numerous anomalous physical measurements, including bond lengths and dipole moments, have been examined through this concept. The original formulation of the Baker–Nathan effect is no longer employed due to more logical reasons for rate accelerations in solutions and its historical context is discussed by Saltzman.
