= Negative hyperconjugation =

Phenomenon in organic chemistry

A schematic representation of negative hyperconjugation. In real systems, several of the hydrogens are replaced with other functional groups.

In organic chemistry, negative hyperconjugation is the donation of electron density from a filled π- or p-orbital to a neighboring σ^{*}-orbital. This phenomenon, a type of resonance, can stabilize the molecule or transition state. It also causes an elongation of the σ-bond by adding electron density to its antibonding orbital.

Negative hyperconjugation is rarely observed, though it can be most commonly observed when the σ^{*}-orbital is located on certain C–F or C–O bonds.

In negative hyperconjugation, the electron density flows in the opposite direction (from a π- or p-orbital to an empty σ^{*}-orbital) than it does in the more common hyperconjugation (from a σ-orbital to an empty p-orbital).

== See also ==
- Negative hyperconjugation in silicon
- Conjugated system
