= Negative hyperconjugation in silicon =

Special type of hyperconjugation

Negative hyperconjugation is a theorized phenomenon in organosilicon compounds, in which hyperconjugation stabilizes or destabilizes certain accumulations of positive charge. The phenomenon explains corresponding peculiarities in the stereochemistry and rate of hydrolysis.

Second-row elements generally stabilize adjacent carbanions more effectively than their first-row congeners; conversely they destabilize adjacent carbocations, and these effects reverse one atom over. For phosphorus and later elements, these phenomena are easily ascribed to the element's greater electronegativity than carbon. However, Si has lower electronegativity than carbon, polarizing the electron density onto carbon.

The continued presence of second-row type stability in certain organosilicon compounds is known as the silicon α and β effects, after the corresponding locants. These stabilities occur because of a partial overlap between the C–Si σ orbital and the σ* antibonding orbital at the β position, lowering the S_{N} reaction transition state's energy. This hyperconjugation requires an antiperiplanar relationship between the Si group and the leaving group to maximize orbital overlap.

Moreover, there is also another kind of silicon α effect, which is mainly about the hydrolysis on the silicon atom.

== Experimental evidence ==
In 1946, Leo Sommer and Frank C. Whitmore reported that radically chlorinating liquid ethyltrichlorosilane gave an isomeric mixture with exhibited unexpected reactivity in aqueous base. All chlorides pendant to silicon hydrolyze, but the geminal chlorine on carbon failed to hydrolyze, and the vicinal chlorine eliminated to ethene:

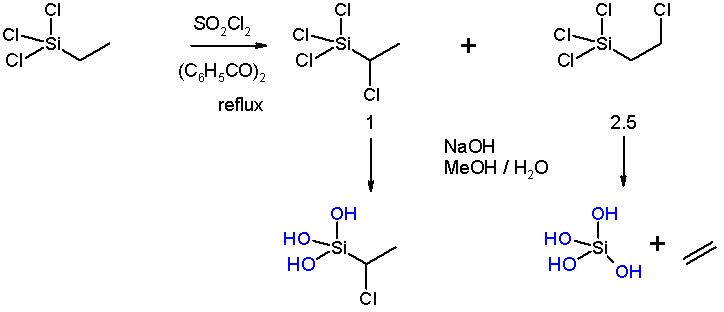
beta-silicon effect

The same behavior appeared with n-propyltrichlorosilane. The α and γ isomers resisted hydrolysis, but a hydroxyl group replaced the β chlorine:

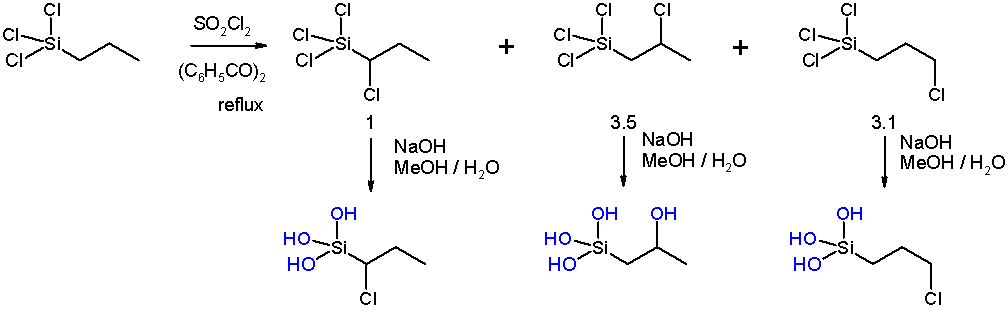
Scheme 3. Beta silicon effect

They concluded that silicon inhibits electrofugal activity at the α carbon.

The silicon effect also manifests in certain compound properties. Trimethylsilylmethylamine (Me_{3}SiCH_{2}NH_{2}) is a stronger base (conjugate pK_{a} 10.96) than neopentylamine (conjugate pK_{a} 10.21); trimethylsilylacetic acid (pKa 5.22) is a poorer acid than trimethylacetic acid (pKa 5.00).

In 1994, Yong and coworkers compared the free-energy effects of α- and β-Si(CH_{3})_{3} moieties on C–H homo- and heterolysis. They, too, concluded that the β silicon atom could stabilize carbocations and the α silicon destabilize carbocations.

== Orbital structure ==
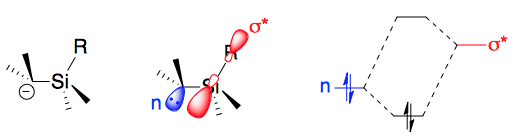
Stabilisation of anions by silicon

The silicon α and β effects arise because 3rd period heteroatoms can stabilize adjacent carbanions charges via (negative) hyperconjugation.

In the α effect, reactions that develop negative charge adjacent to the silicon, such as metalations, exhibit accelerated rates. The C–M σ orbital partially overlaps the C–Si σ* anti-bonding orbital, which stabilizes the C–M bond. More generally, (i.e. even for "naked" carbanions) the Si σ* orbitals help stabilize the electrons on the α carbon. In this regard, triorganylsilyl groups act as π acceptors.

In the β effect, reactions that develop positive charge on carbon atoms β to the silicon accelerate. The C–Si σ orbital partially overlaps with the C–X (leaving group) σ* orbital (2b):

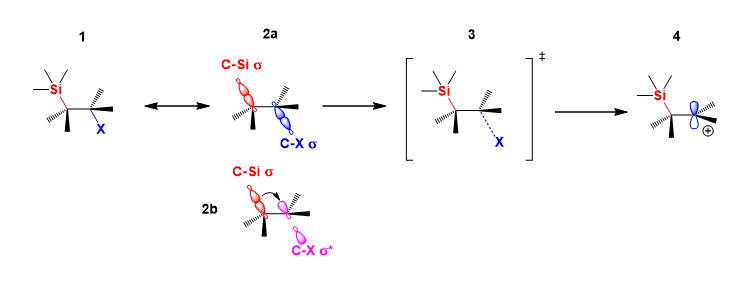

This electron-density donation into the anti-bonding orbital weakens the C–X bond, decreasing the barrier to the cleavage indicated 3, and favoring formation of the carbenium 4.

== In silyl ethers ==
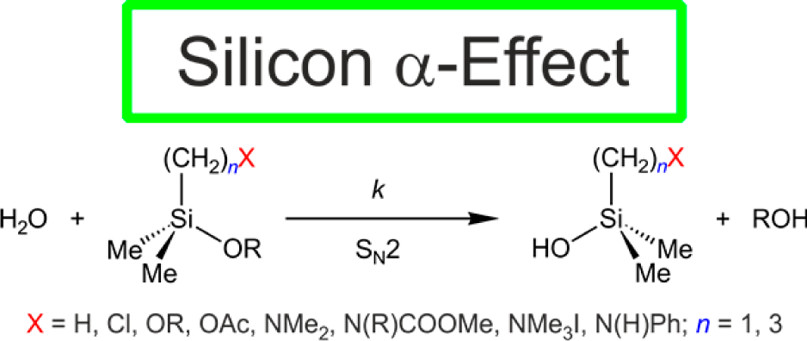
Silicon alpha-effect

The silicon α‑effect described above is mainly focused on carbon. In fact, the most industrially-important silicon α‑effect instead occurs with silyl ethers. Under hydrolysis condition, certain α-silane-terminated prepolymers crosslink 10-1000 times faster than the corresponding prepolymers produced from conventional C_{γ}-functionalized trialkoxypropylsilanes and dialkoxymethylpropylsilanes.

=== History ===
This silicon α-effect was first observed in the late 1960s by researchers at Bayer AG as an increase in reactivity at the silicon atom for hydrolysis and was used for cross-linking of α-silane-terminated prepolymers. For a long time after that, people attributed this reactivity as silicon α-effect. However, the real mechanism beneath it had been debated for many years after this discovery. Generally, this effect has been rationalized as an intramolecular donor-acceptor interaction between the lone pair of the organofunctional group (such as NR_{2}, OC(O)R, N(H)COOMe) and the silicon atom. However, this hypothesis has been proved incorrect by Mitzel and coworkers and more experiments are needed to interpret this effect.

=== Mechanism study ===
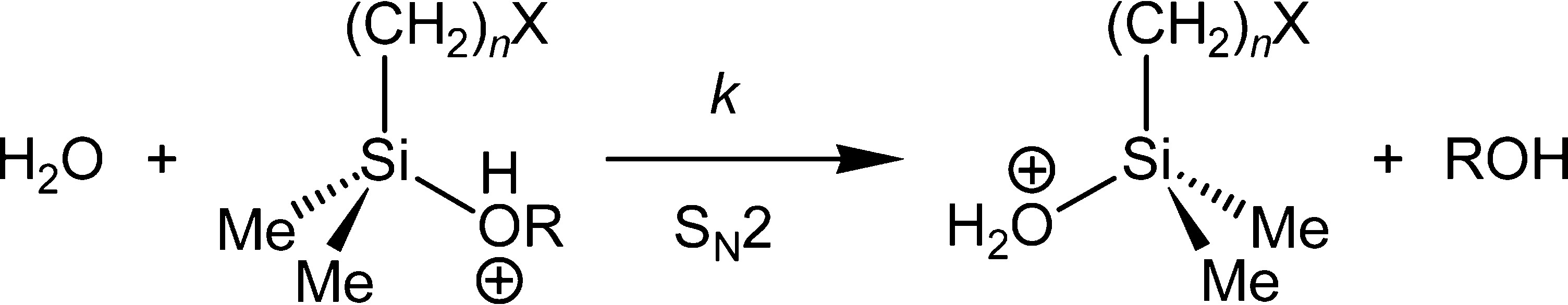
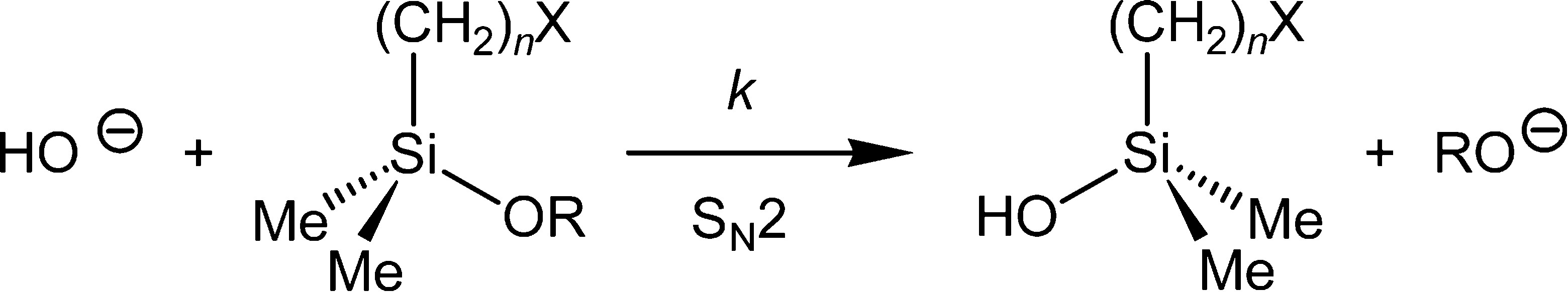
Acid and base hydrolysis of α- and γ-silanes

Reinhold and coworkers performed a systematical experiment to study the kinetics and mechanisms of hydrolysis of such compounds. They prepared a series of α-silanes and γ-silanes and tested their reactivity in different pH (acidic and basic regime), functional group X and the spacer between the silicon atom and the functional group X.

In general, they find that under basic conditions, the rate of hydrolysis is mainly controlled by the electrophilicity of the silicon center and the rate of the hydrolysis of the γ-silanes is less influenced by the generally electronegative functional groups than α-silanes. More electronegative the functional groups are, the higher the rate of hydrolysis. However, under acidic conditions, the rate of hydrolysis depends on both the electrophilicity of the silicon center (determining the molecular reactivity) and the concentration of the (protonated) reactive species. Under acidic conditions, the nucleophile changes from OH^{−} to H_{2}O, so it involves the process of protonation and the atoms are protonated could be either silicon or the functional group X. As a result, the general trend in acidic solution is more complicated.
