= Delta bond =

Type of chemical bond

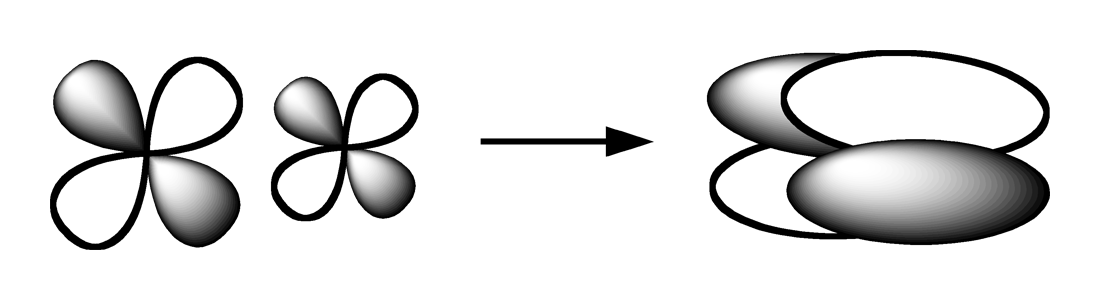
Formation of a δ bond by the overlap of two d orbitals

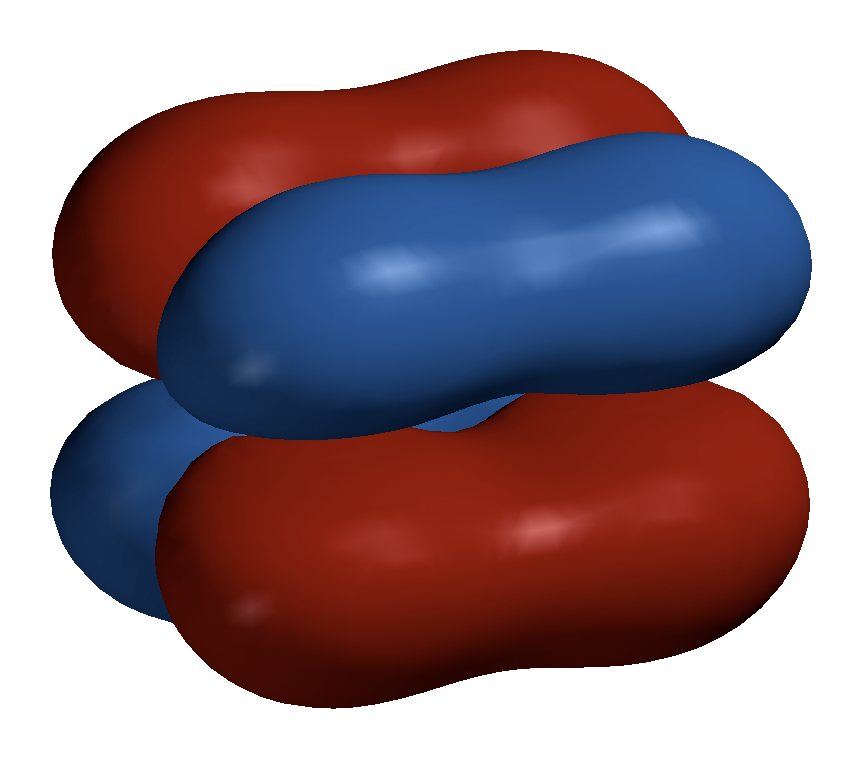
3D model of a boundary surface of a δ bond in Mo_{2}

In chemistry, a delta bond (δ bond) is a covalent chemical bond, in which four lobes of an atomic orbital on one atom overlap four lobes of an atomic orbital on another atom. This overlap leads to the formation of a bonding molecular orbital with two nodal planes which contain the internuclear axis and go through both atoms.

The Greek letter δ in their name refers to d orbitals, since the orbital symmetry of the δ bond is the same as that of the usual (4-lobed) type of d orbital when seen down the bond axis. This type of bonding is observed in atoms that have occupied d orbitals with low enough energy to participate in covalent bonding, for example, in organometallic species of transition metals. Some rhenium, molybdenum, technetium, and chromium compounds contain a quadruple bond, consisting of one σ bond, two π bonds and one δ bond. In the case of the [Re_{2}Cl_{8}]^{2-} ion in the D_{4h} Point group, the bonding delta interaction is the highest energy bonding interaction, followed by the bonding pi, and sigma interactions. The resultant antibonding delta interaction is the least destabilized, followed by the antibonding pi and sigma interactions.

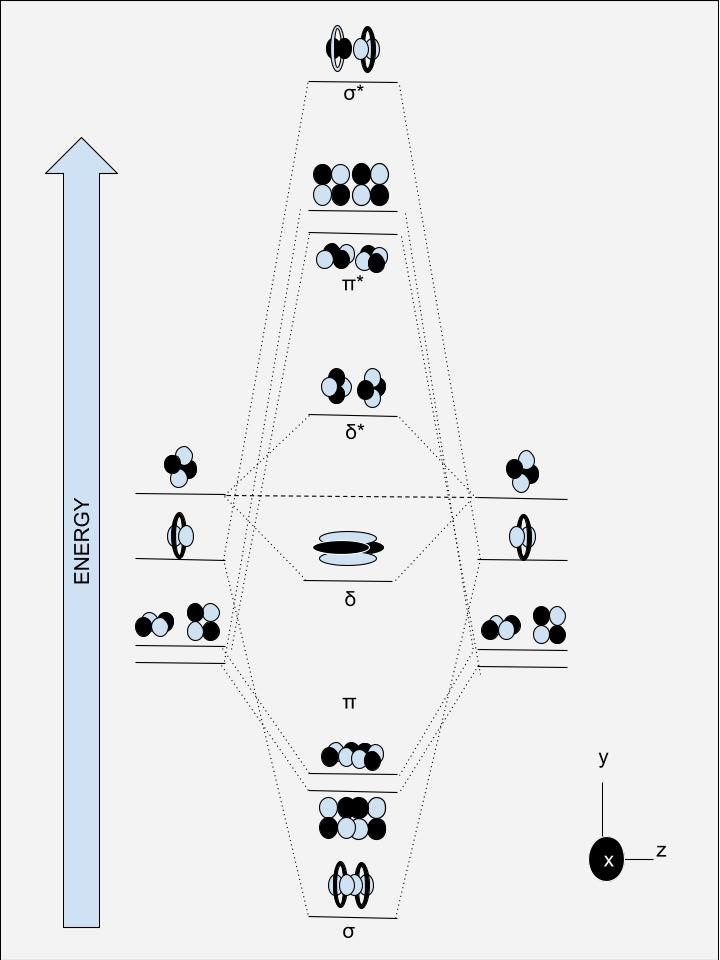
Molecular Orbital Diagram of D_{4h} [Re_{2}Cl_{8}]^{2-} showing the bonding and antibonding d orbital interactions and their relative energies. the d_{x}^{2}_{-y}^{2} is omitted from d-d interactions due to its engagement with chloride ligands

The orbital symmetry of the δ bonding orbital is different from that of a π antibonding orbital, which has one nodal plane containing the internuclear axis and a second nodal plane perpendicular to this axis between the atoms.

The δ notation was introduced by Robert Mulliken in 1931. The first compound identified as having a δ bond was potassium octachlorodirhenate(III). In 1965, F. A. Cotton reported that there was δ-bonding as part of the rhenium–rhenium quadruple bond in the [Re_{2}Cl_{8}]^{2−} ion. Another example of a δ bond is proposed in cyclobutadieneiron tricarbonyl between an iron d orbital and the four p orbitals of the attached cyclobutadiene molecule.

== See also ==
- Pi bond
- Sigma bond
- Phi bond
