= Mesomeric effect =

Chemical polarity due to interactions between pi bonds or lone pairs

In chemistry, the mesomeric effect (or resonance effect) is a property of substituents or functional groups in a chemical compound. It is defined as the polarity produced in the molecule by the interaction of two pi bonds or between a pi bond and lone pair of electrons present on an adjacent atom. This change in electron arrangement results in the formation of resonance structures that hybridize into the molecule's true structure. The pi electrons then move away from or toward a particular substituent group. The mesomeric effect is stronger in compounds with a lower ionization potential. This is because the electron transfer states will have lower energies.

== Representations of the mesomeric effect ==
The effect is used in a qualitative way and describes the electron withdrawing or releasing properties of substituents based on relevant resonance structures and is symbolized by the letter M. The mesomeric effect is negative (−M) when the substituent is an electron-withdrawing group, and the effect is positive (+M) when the substituent is an electron donating group. Below are two examples of the +M and −M effect. Additionally, the functional groups that contribute to each type of resonance are given below.

=== +M effect ===
The +M effect, also known as the positive mesomeric effect, occurs when the substituent is an electron donating group. The group must have one of two things: a lone pair of electrons, or a negative charge. In the +M effect, the pi electrons are transferred from the group towards the conjugate system, increasing the density of the system. Due to the increase in electron density, the conjugate system will develop a more negative charge. As a result, the system under the +M effect will be more reactive towards electrophiles, which can take away the negative charge, than a nucleophile.

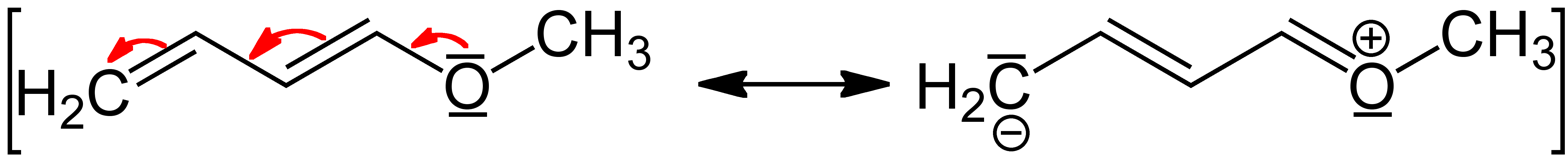
+M effect from a methoxy (−OCH_{3}) substituent

+M effect order:

−O^{−} > −NH_{2} > −NHR > −NR_{2} > −OH > −OR > −NHCOR > −OCOR > −Ph > −F > −Cl > −Br > −I > −NO

=== −M effect ===
The −M effect, also known as the negative mesomeric effect, occurs when the substituent is an electron-withdrawing group. In order for a negative mesomeric (−M) effect to occur, the group must have a positive charge or an empty orbital in order to draw the electrons towards it. In the −M effect, the pi electrons move away from the conjugate system and towards the electron drawing group. In the conjugate system, the density of electrons decreases and the overall charge becomes more positive. With the −M effect the groups and compounds become less reactive towards electrophiles, and more reactive toward nucleophiles, which can give up electrons and balance out the positive charge.

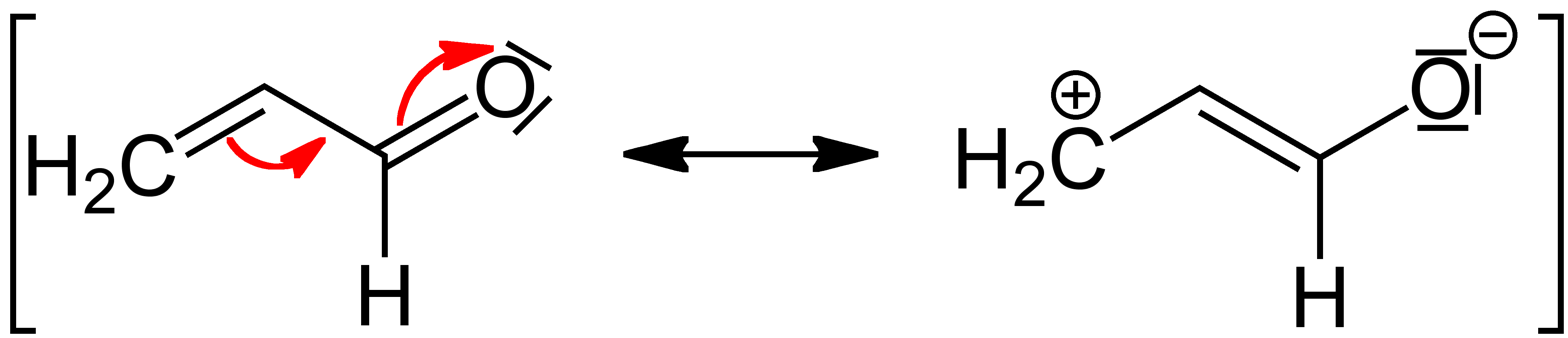
−M effect from a formyl (−CHO) substituent

−M effect order:

−NO_{2} > −CN > −SO_{3}H > −CHO > −COR > −COOCOR > −COOR > −COOH > −CONH_{2} > −COO^{−}

== Mesomeric effect vs. inductive effect ==
The net electron flow from or to the substituent is determined also by the inductive effect. The mesomeric effect as a result of p-orbital overlap (resonance) has absolutely no effect on this inductive effect, as the inductive effect has purely to do with the electronegativity of the atoms and their topology in the molecule (which atoms are connected to which). Specifically the inductive effect is the tendency for the substituents to repel or attract electrons purely based on electronegativity and not dealing with restructuring. The mesomeric effect however, deals with restructuring and occurs when the electron pair of the substituents shift around. The inductive effect only acts on alpha carbons, while the mesomeric utilizes pi bonds between atoms. While these two paths often lead to the similar molecules and resonance structures, the mechanism is different. As such, the mesomeric effect is stronger than the inductive effect.

The concepts of mesomeric effect, mesomerism and mesomer were introduced by Ingold in 1938 as an alternative to Pauling's synonymous concept of resonance. "Mesomerism" in this context is often encountered in German and French literature, but in English literature the term "resonance" dominates.

== Mesomerism in conjugated systems ==
Mesomeric effect can be transmitted along any number of carbon atoms in a conjugated system. This accounts for the resonance stabilization of the molecule due to delocalization of charge. The energy of the actual structure of the molecule, i.e. the resonance hybrid, may be lower than that of any of the contributing canonical structures. The difference in energy between the actual inductive structure and the (most stable contributing structures) worst kinetic structure is called the resonance energy or resonance stabilization energy. For the quantitative estimation of the mesomeric/resonance effect strength, various substituent constants are used, i.e. the Swain-Lupton resonance constant, Taft resonance constant or Oziminski and Dobrowolski pEDA parameter.

Additionally, the resulting resonance structures can give the molecule properties that are not inherently evident from looking at one structure. Some of these properties include different reactivities, local diamagnetic shielding in aromatics, deshielding, and acid and base strengths.
