= Potassium octachlorodirhenate =

Names
- Other names Dipotassium dirhenium(III) octachloride, potassium octachloridodirhenate(III)

Identifiers
CAS Number	13841-78-6
3D model (JSmol)	Interactive image
- InChI: InChI=1S/8ClH.2K.2Re/h8*1H;;;;/q;;;;;;;;2*+1;2*+2/p-8 Key: MPYYMYVSQGWPBD-UHFFFAOYSA-F
- SMILES: [K+].[K+].Cl[Re-](Cl)(Cl)(Cl)$[Re-](Cl)(Cl)(Cl)Cl

Properties
Chemical formula	K_{2}Re_{2}Cl_{8}
Appearance	blue solid
- Except where otherwise noted, data are given for materials in their standard state (at 25 °C [77 °F], 100 kPa). Infobox references

Potassium octachlorodirhenate(III) is an inorganic compound with the formula K_{2}Re_{2}Cl_{8}. This dark blue salt is well known as an early example of a compound featuring quadruple bond between its metal centers. Although the compound has no practical value, its characterization was significant in opening a new field of research into complexes with quadruple bonds.

== Synthesis and reactions ==
Soviet chemists first reported K_{2}[Re_{2}Cl_{8}] in 1954, but it was not until 1964 that Cotton and Harris characterized the compound as featuring a short Re–Re bond, the first of its kind discovered. The results of this classic study subsequently led to new work into other metals capable of forming metal–metal bonds, such as chromium, molybdenum, tungsten, and technetium.

A high-yield synthesis of the tetrabutylammonium salt involves treating the perrhenate salt with benzoyl chloride followed by HCl:

2 [(n-C_{4}H_{9})_{4}N]ReO_{4} + 8 C_{6}H_{5}COCl → [(n-C_{4}H_{9})_{4}N]_{2}[Re_{2}Cl_{8}] + organic products

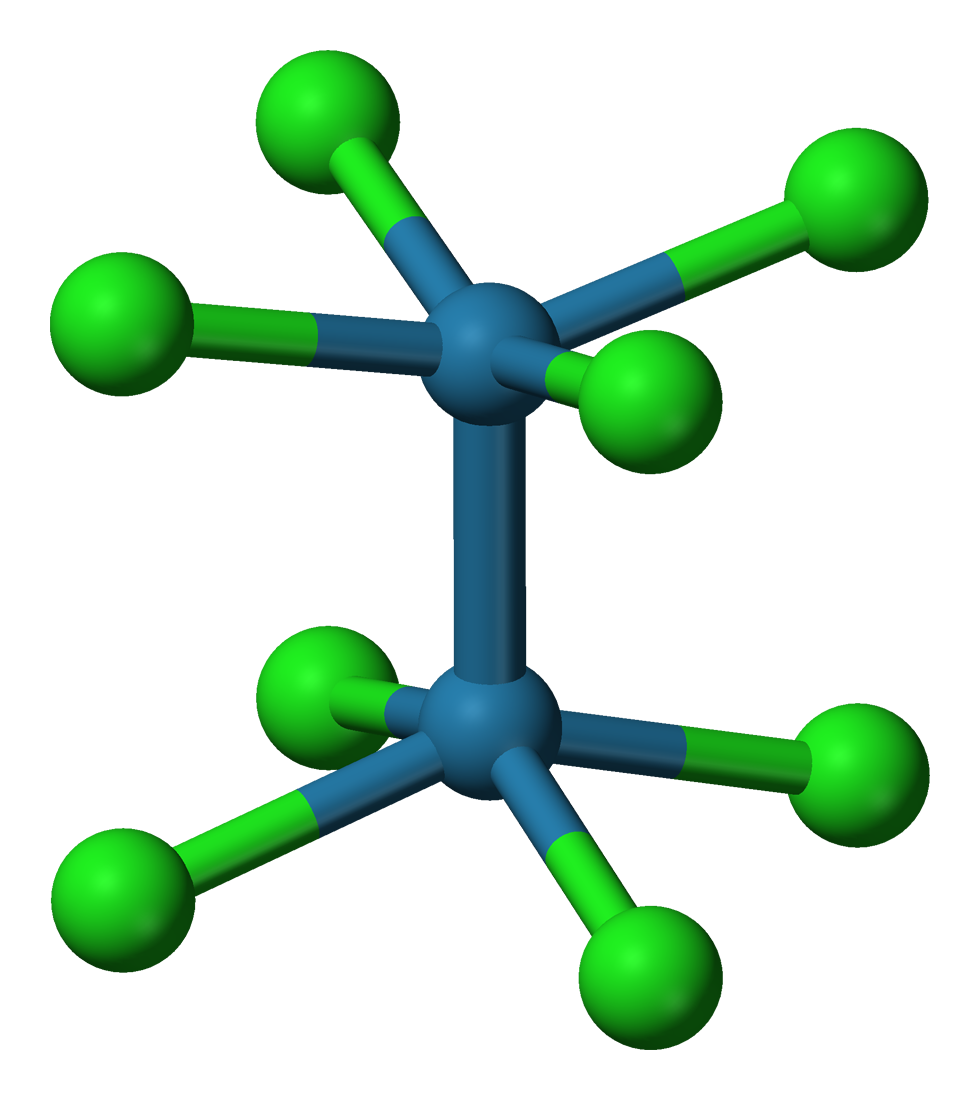
Structure of the anion [Re_{2}Cl_{8}]^{2−}

Octachlorodirhenate(III) is a precursor to other complexes with multiply-bonded rhenium centers as the quadruple bond is quite stable and is often maintained in ligand substitution reactions. For example, upon treatment with concentrated HBr, the complex forms the analogous anion [Re_{2}Br_{8}]^{2−}, which can easily be converted into other dirhenium species.

== Structure and bonding ==
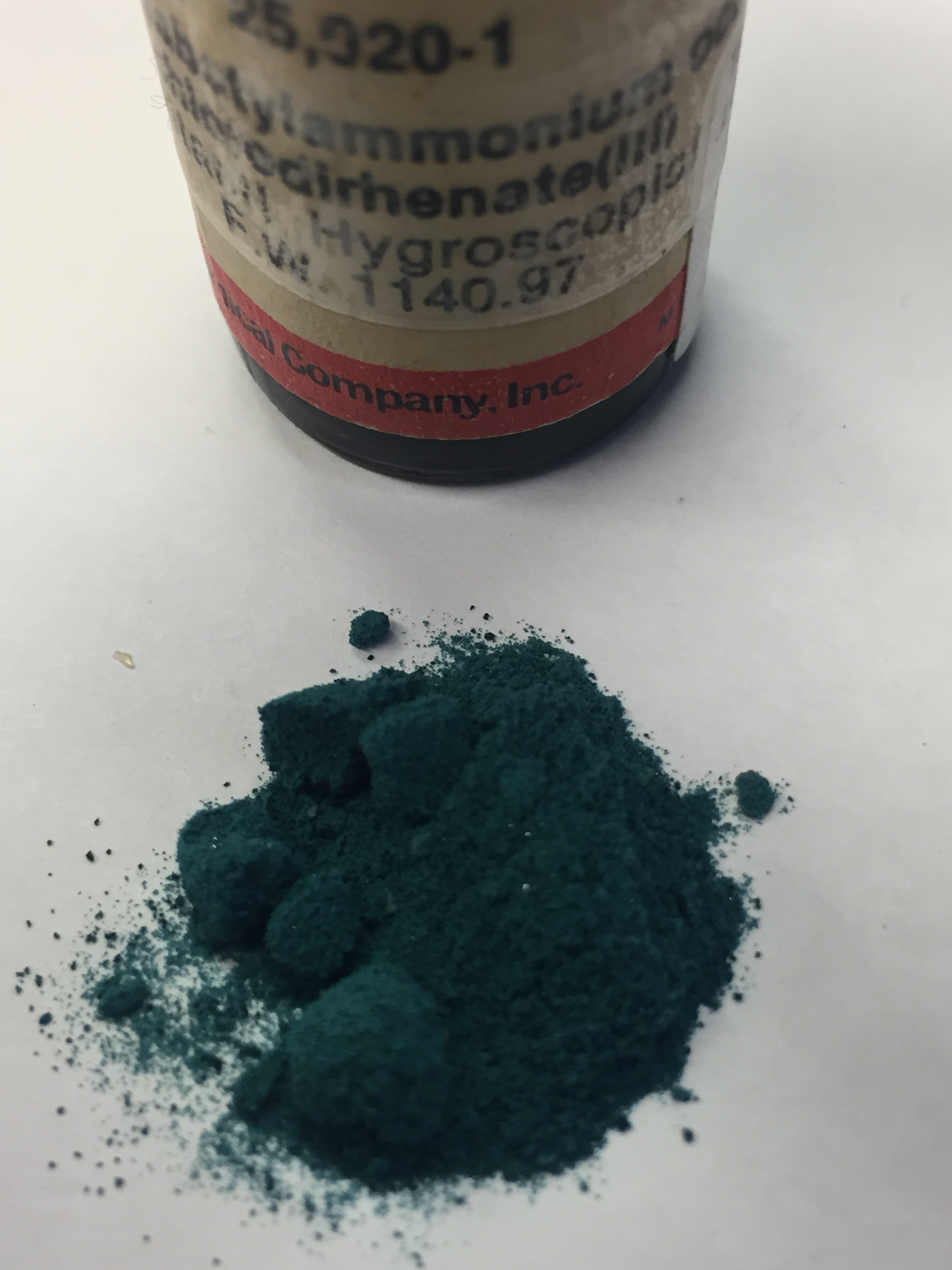
Sample of (NBu_{4})_{2}Re_{2}Cl_{8}, illustrating the blue-green [Re_{2}Cl_{8}]^{2-} chromophore

In the [Re_{2}Cl_{8}]^{2−}, the Re–Re bond distance is 2.24 Å, the Re–Re–Cl bond angles are 104°, and the Cl–Re–Cl angles are 87°. The chloride ligands are fully eclipsed. Although this geometry results in repulsive interactions between the chloride ions, this conformation allows for maximum δ–δ overlap between the Re(III) centers, a factor which overrides the unfavorable chloride repulsions. The [Re_{2}Cl_{8}]^{2−} anion has a weak electrophilic character. With the configuration, Re(III) is well suited to engage in quadruple bonding. Electrons are allocated to give the configuration σ^{2}π^{4}δ^{2}, resulting in a bond order of 4 between the rhenium centers. The brilliant color of the [Re_{2}Cl_{8}]^{2−} arises from the δ→δ* electronic transition.
