= Potassium octachlorodimolybdate =

Potassium octachlorodimolybdate(4−)
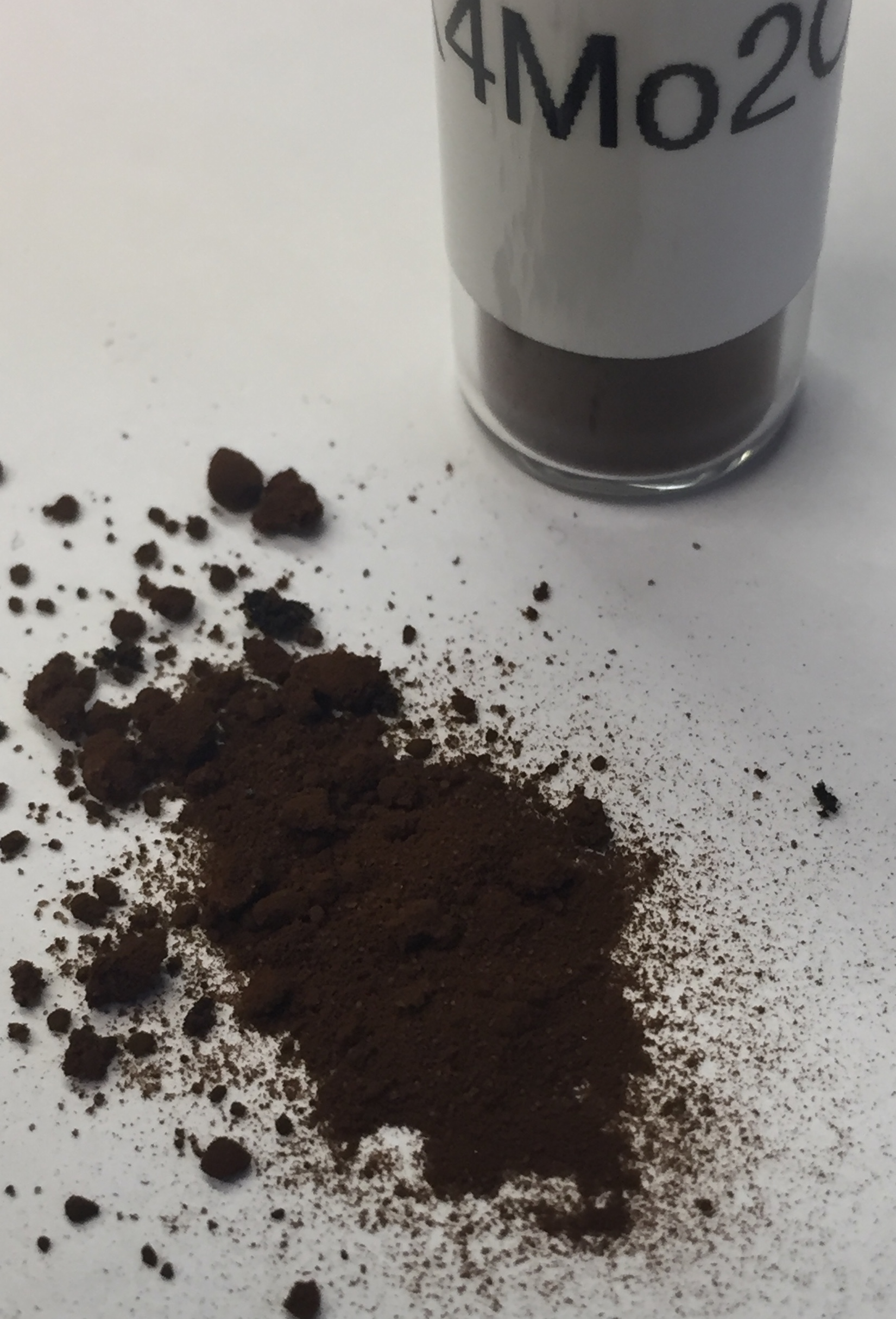

Identifiers
CAS Number	25448-39-9
3D model (JSmol)	Interactive image
PubChem CID	165339348
CompTox Dashboard (EPA)	DTXSID00330354 DTXSID501045175, DTXSID00330354
- InChI: InChI=1S/8ClH.4K.2Mo/h8*1H;;;;;;/q;;;;;;;;4*+1;2*+2/p-8 Key: IPKVUDXOBCRDJX-UHFFFAOYSA-F
- SMILES: [K+].[K+].[K+].[K+].Cl[Mo-2](Cl)(Cl)(Cl)$[Mo-2](Cl)(Cl)(Cl)Cl

Properties
Chemical formula	K_{4}Mo_{2}Cl_{8}
Molar mass	631.89 g·mol^{−1}
Appearance	red crystals
Density	2.54 g/cm^{3}
Solubility in water	soluble
- Except where otherwise noted, data are given for materials in their standard state (at 25 °C [77 °F], 100 kPa). verify (what is ?) Infobox references

Potassium octachlorodimolybdate (systematically named potassium bis(tetrachloromolybdate)(Mo–Mo)(4−)) is an inorganic compound with the chemical formula K_{4}Mo_{2}Cl_{8}. It is known as a red-coloured, microcrystalline solid. The anion is of historic interest as one of the earliest illustrations of a quadruple bonding. The salt is usually obtained as the pink-coloured dihydrate.

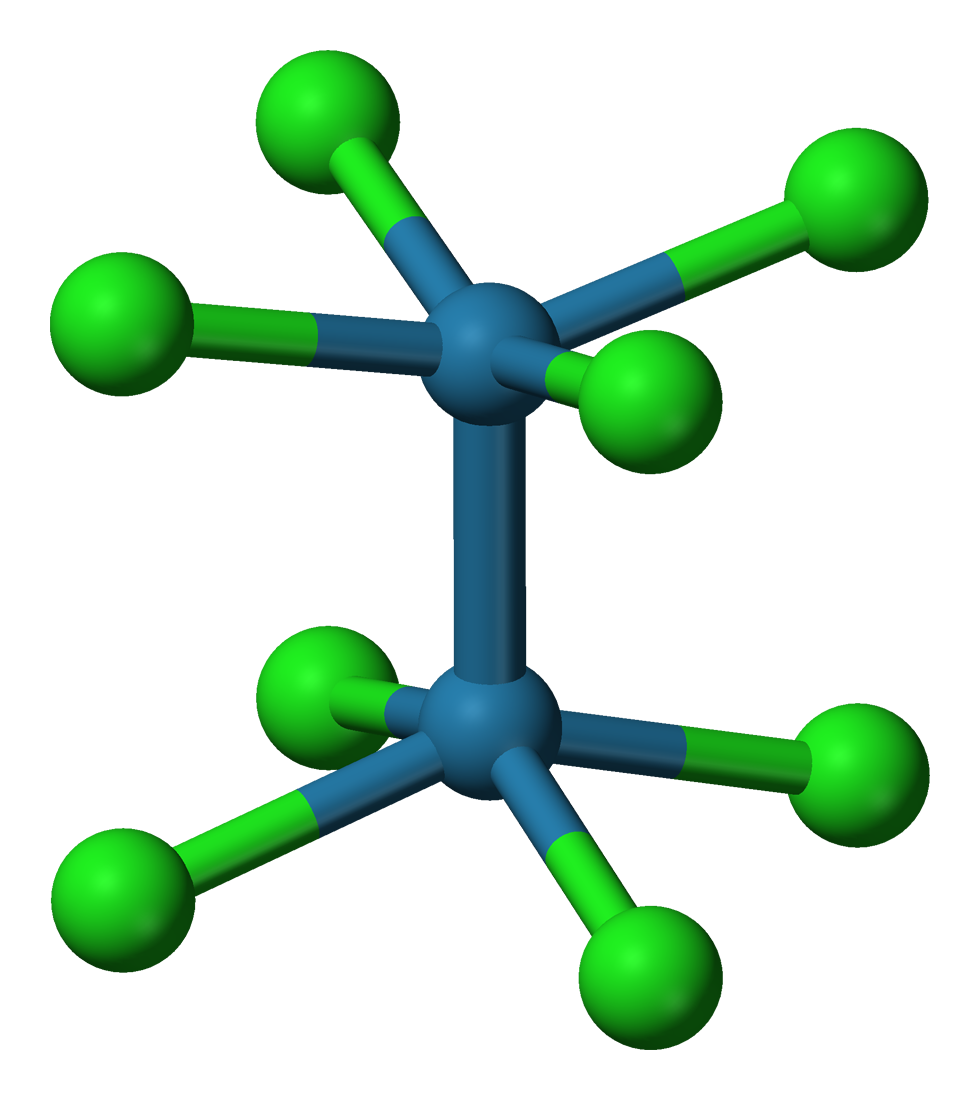
The octachlorodimolybdate(II) anion, Mo_{2}Cl_{8}^{4−}, which features a quadruple Mo–Mo bond

The compound is prepared in two steps from molybdenum hexacarbonyl:

2 Mo(CO)_{6} + 4 CH_{3}CO_{2}H → (CH_{3}CO_{2})_{4}Mo_{2} + 2 H_{2} + 12 CO
(CH_{3}CO_{2})_{4}Mo_{2} + 4 HCl + 4 KCl → K_{4}Mo_{2}Cl_{8} + 4 CH_{3}CO_{2}H

The reaction of the acetate with HCl was first described as providing trimolybdenum compounds, but subsequent crystallographic analysis confirmed that the salt contains the [Cl_{4}Mo≣MoCl_{4}]^{4−} anion, with D_{4h} symmetry, in which the two Mo atoms are linked by a quadruple bond. Each Mo atom is bounded with four Cl^{−} ligands by a single bond. Each MoCl_{4} group is a regular square pyramid, with an Mo atom at the apex, and four Cl atoms at the vertices of the square base of the pyramid. The Mo–Mo distance is 214 pm.
