= Quadruple bond =

Chemical bond involving eight electrons

A quadruple bond is a type of chemical bond between two atoms involving eight electrons. This bond is an extension of the more familiar types of covalent bonds: double bonds and triple bonds. Stable quadruple bonds are most common among the transition metals in the middle of the d-block, such as rhenium, tungsten, technetium, molybdenum and chromium. Typically the ligands that support quadruple bonds are π-donors, not π-acceptors. Quadruple bonds are rare as compared to double bonds and triple bonds, but hundreds of compounds with such bonds have been prepared.

The structure of chromium(II) acetate contains a quadruple Cr–Cr bond.

== History ==
Chromium(II) acetate, Cr_{2}(μ-O_{2}CCH_{3})_{4}(H_{2}O)_{2}, was the first chemical compound containing a quadruple bond to be synthesized. It was described in 1844 by E. Peligot, although its distinctive bonding was not recognized for more than a century.

The first crystallographic study of a compound with a quadruple bond was provided by Soviet chemists for salts of Re_{2}Cl^{2−}_{8}. The very short Re–Re distance was noted. This short distance (and the salt's diamagnetism) indicated Re–Re bonding. These researchers, however, misformulated the anion as a derivative of Re(II), i.e., Re_{2}Cl^{4−}_{8}.

Soon thereafter, F. Albert Cotton and Charles B. Harris reported the crystal structure of potassium octachlorodirhenate or K_{2}[Re_{2}Cl_{8}]·2H_{2}O. This structural analysis indicated that the previous characterization was mistaken. Cotton and Harris formulated a molecular orbital rationale for the bonding that explicitly indicated a quadruple bond. The rhenium–rhenium bond length in this compound is only 224 pm. In molecular orbital theory, the bonding is described as σ^{2}π^{4}δ^{2} with one sigma bond, two pi bonds and one delta bond.

== Structure and bonding ==
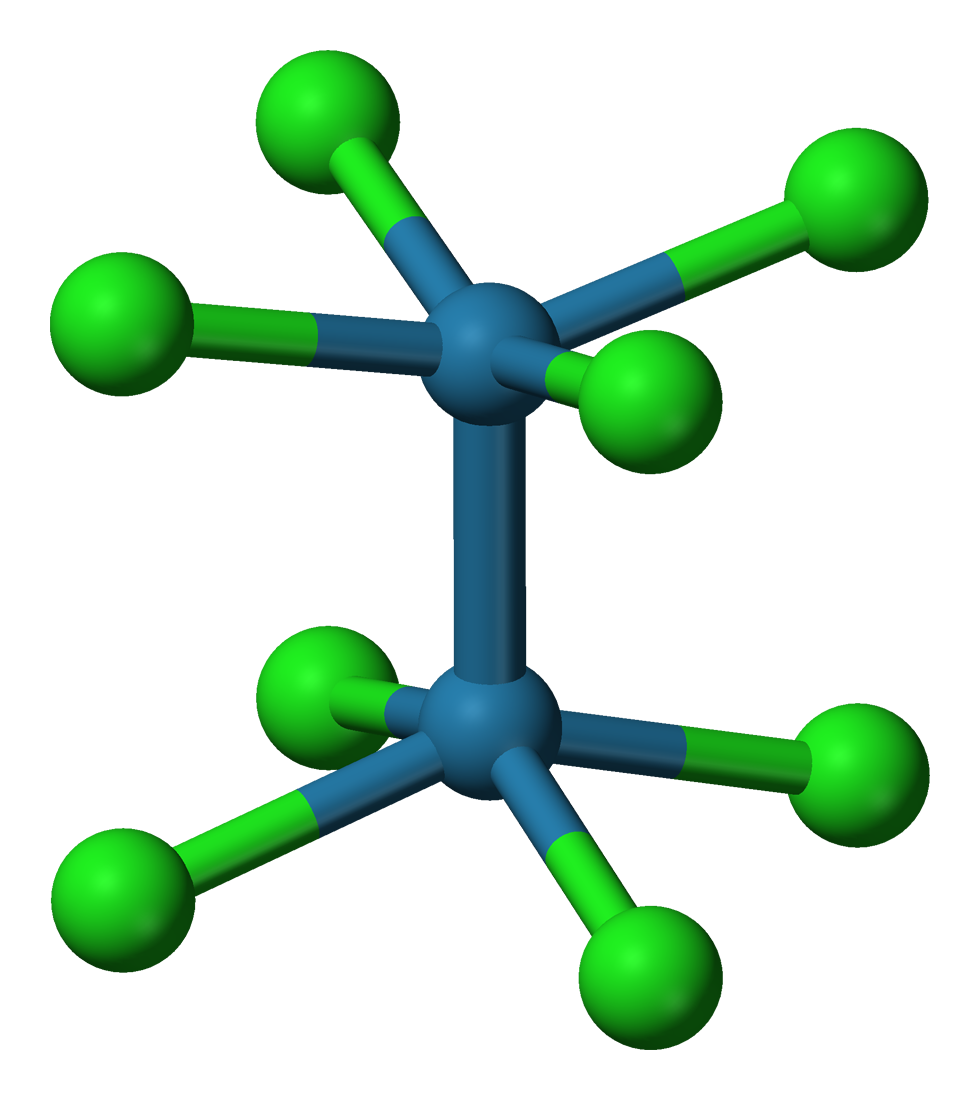
The octachlorodirhenate(III) anion, [Re_{2}Cl_{8}]^{2−}, which features a quadruple Re–Re bond

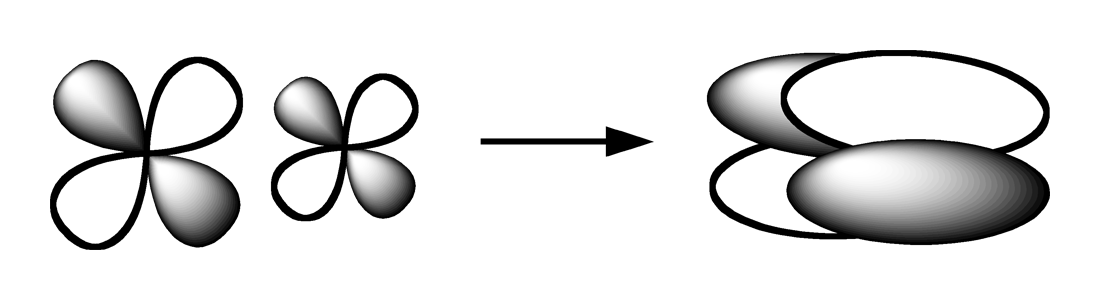
Formation of a delta bond by the overlap of two d orbitals

The [Re_{2}Cl_{8}]^{2−} ion adopts an eclipsed conformation as shown at left. The delta bonding orbital is then formed by overlap of the d orbitals on each rhenium atom, which are perpendicular to the Re–Re axis and lie in between the Re–Cl bonds. The d orbitals directed along the Re–Cl bonds are stabilized by interaction with chloride ligand orbitals and do not contribute to Re–Re bonding. In contrast, the [Os_{2}Cl_{8}]^{2−} ion with two more electrons (σ^{2}π^{4}δ^{2}δ*^{2}) has an Os–Os triple bond and a staggered geometry.

Many other compounds with quadruple bonds between transition metal atoms have been described, often by Cotton and his coworkers. Isoelectronic with the dirhenium compound is the salt K_{4}[Mo_{2}Cl_{8}] (potassium octachlorodimolybdate). An example of a ditungsten compound with a quadruple bond is ditungsten tetra(hpp).

Quadruple bonds between atoms of main-group elements are unknown. For the diatomic carbon (C_{2}) molecule as an example, molecular orbital theory shows that there are two sets of paired electrons in the sigma system (one bonding, one antibonding), and two sets of paired electrons in a degenerate π-bonding set of orbitals. This adds up to a bond order of 2, meaning that there exists a double bond between the two carbon atoms. The molecular orbital diagram of diatomic carbon would show that there are two pi bonds and no sigma bonds. A 2012 paper by S. Shaik et al. suggests that a quadruple bond exists in dicarbon, but this is disputed.

== See also ==
- Bond order
