= Pi bond =

Type of chemical bond

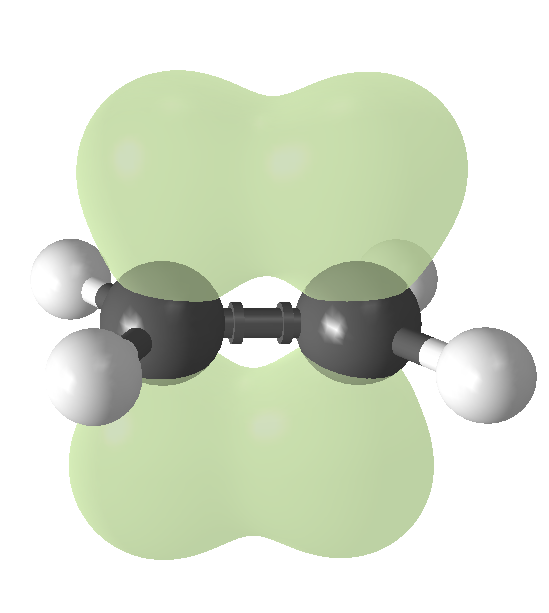
Ethylene (ethene), a small organic molecule containing a pi bond, shown in green.

In chemistry, pi bonds (π bonds) are covalent chemical bonds, in which each of two lobes of an orbital on one atom overlap with two lobes of an orbital on another atom, and in which this overlap occurs laterally. Each of these atomic orbitals has an electron density of zero at a shared nodal plane that passes through the two bonded nuclei. This plane also is a nodal plane for the molecular orbital of the pi bond. Pi bonds can form in double and triple bonds but do not form in single bonds in most cases.

The Greek letter π in their name refers to p orbitals, since the orbital symmetry of the pi bond is the same as that of the p orbital when seen down the bond axis. One common form of this sort of bonding involves p orbitals themselves, though d orbitals also engage in pi bonding. This latter mode forms part of the basis for metal-metal multiple bonding.

== Properties ==
Two p-orbitals forming a π-bond.

Pi bonds are usually weaker than sigma bonds. The C–C double bond, composed of one sigma and one pi bond, has a bond energy less than twice that of a C–C single bond, indicating that the stability added by the pi bond is less than the stability of a sigma bond. From the perspective of quantum mechanics, this bond's weakness is explained by significantly less overlap between the component p-orbitals due to their parallel orientation. This is contrasted by sigma bonds which form bonding orbitals directly between the nuclei of the bonding atoms, resulting in greater overlap and a strong sigma bond.

Pi bonds result from overlap of atomic orbitals that are in contact through two areas of overlap. Most orbital overlaps that do not include the s-orbital, or have different internuclear axes (for example p_{x} + p_{y} overlap, which does not apply to an s-orbital) are generally all pi bonds. Pi bonds are more diffuse bonds than the sigma bonds. Electrons in pi bonds are sometimes referred to as pi electrons. Molecular fragments joined by a pi bond cannot rotate about that bond without breaking the pi bond, because rotation involves destroying the parallel orientation of the constituent p orbitals.

For homonuclear diatomic molecules, bonding π molecular orbitals have only the one nodal plane passing through the bonded atoms, and no nodal planes between the bonded atoms. The corresponding antibonding, or π* ("pi-star") molecular orbital, is defined by the presence of an additional nodal plane between these two bonded atoms.

== Multiple bonds ==
A typical double bond consists of one sigma bond and one pi bond, as in the C=C double bond in ethylene (H_{2}C=CH_{2}). A typical triple bond, for example in acetylene (HC≡CH), consists of one sigma bond and two pi bonds in two mutually perpendicular planes containing the bond axis. Two pi bonds are the maximum that can exist between a given pair of atoms. Quadruple bonds are extremely rare and can be formed only between transition metal atoms, and consist of one sigma bond, two pi bonds and one delta bond.

A pi bond is weaker than a sigma bond, but the combination of pi and sigma bond is stronger than either bond by itself. The enhanced strength of a multiple bond versus a single (sigma bond) is indicated in many ways, but most obviously by a contraction in bond lengths. For example, in organic chemistry, carbon–carbon bond lengths are about 154 pm in ethane, 134 pm in ethylene and 120 pm in acetylene. More bonds make the total bond length shorter and the bond becomes stronger.

Comparison of bond-lengths in simple structures
ethane (1 σ bond)	ethylene (1 σ bond + 1 π bond)	acetylene (1 σ bond + 2 π bonds)

== Special cases ==
A pi bond can exist between two atoms that do not have a net sigma-bonding effect between them.

In certain metal complexes, pi interactions between a metal atom and alkyne and alkene pi antibonding orbitals form pi-bonds.

In some cases of multiple bonds between two atoms, there is no net sigma-bonding at all, only pi bonds. Examples include diiron hexacarbonyl (Fe_{2}(CO)_{6}), dicarbon (C_{2}), and diborane(2) (B_{2}H_{2}). In these compounds the central bond consists only of pi bonding because of a sigma antibond accompanying the sigma bond itself. These compounds have been used as computational models for analysis of pi bonding itself, revealing that in order to achieve maximum orbital overlap the bond distances are much shorter than expected.

== See also ==
- Aromatic interaction
- Delta bond
- Molecular geometry
- Pi backbonding
- Pi interaction
- Sigma bond
