= Ruthenium(III) acetate =

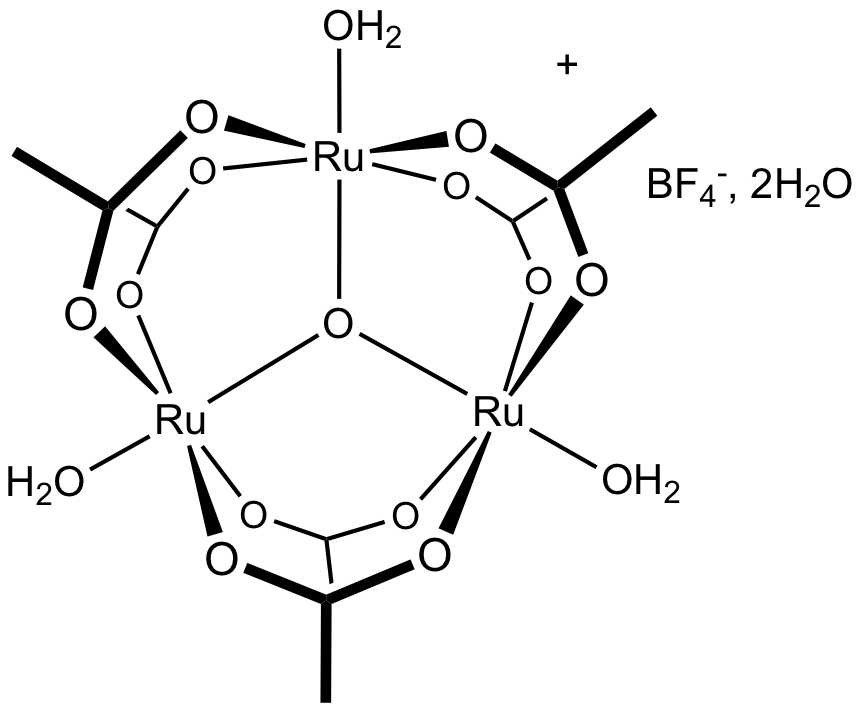

Identifiers
CAS Number	55466-76-7
3D model (JSmol)	Interactive image
EC Number	259-653-7
- InChI: InChI=1S/6C2H4O2.3H2O.O.3Ru/c6*1-2(3)4;;;;;;;/h6*1H3,(H,3,4);3*1H2;;;;/q;;;;;;;;;;3*+2/p-6 Key: KVUJOTGIJBOLLI-UHFFFAOYSA-H
- SMILES: O1C(C)=[O+][Ru-3]6(O23)([OH2+])([O+]=C(C)O4)[O+]=C(C)O[Ru-3]24([OH2+])([O+]=C(C)O5)[O+]=C(C)O[Ru-3]135([OH2+])[O+]=C(C)O6

Properties
Chemical formula	C_{12}H_{28}BF_{4}O_{18}Ru_{3}
Molar mass	850.35 g·mol^{−1}
Appearance	green solid
Density	2.110 g/cm^{3}

Structure
Coordination geometry	octahedral

Hazards
- GHS labelling
Pictograms	(GHS05: Corrosive) (GHS09: Environmental hazard)
Signal word	Danger
Hazard statements	H318, H410
Precautionary statements	P273, P280, P305+P351+P338, P310, P391, P501

Related compounds
Related compounds	Manganese(III) acetate Iron(III) acetate
- Except where otherwise noted, data are given for materials in their standard state (at 25 °C [77 °F], 100 kPa). Infobox references

Ruthenium(III) acetate, commonly known as basic ruthenium acetate, describes a family of salts where the cation has the formula [Ru_{3}O(O_{2}CCH_{3})_{6}(OH_{2})_{3}]^{+}. A representative derivative is the dihydrate of the tetrafluoroborate salt [Ru_{3}O(O_{2}CCH_{3})_{6}(OH_{2})_{3}]BF_{4}(H_{2}O)_{2}, which is the source of the data in the table above. This and related salts are forest green, air-stable solids that are soluble in alcohols.

Basic ruthenium acetate features octahedral Ru(III) centers, a triply bridging oxo ligand, six acetate ligands, and three aquo ligands. The same structure is shared with basic acetates of iron, chromium, iridium, and manganese.

== Preparation and reactions ==
It is prepared by heating ruthenium trichloride in acetic acid in the presence of sodium acetate. The basic acetates of ruthenium were reported in the early 1950s but were not properly formulated.

Basic ruthenium acetate reacts with many ligands such as triphenylphosphine and pyridine concomitant with reduction. These derivatives [Ru_{3}O(O_{2}CCH_{3})_{6}L_{3}]^{0} are mixed valence compounds.

== Related compounds ==
- Diruthenium tetraacetate chloride

[Ru_{2}(OAc)_{4}Cl]_{n} is a coordination polymer with a composition similar to that of ruthenium(III) acetate.
