= Chromium acetate =

Chromium acetate may refer to:

- Chromium(II) acetate
- Chromium(III) acetate
