= Transition metal carboxylate complex =

Class of chemical compounds

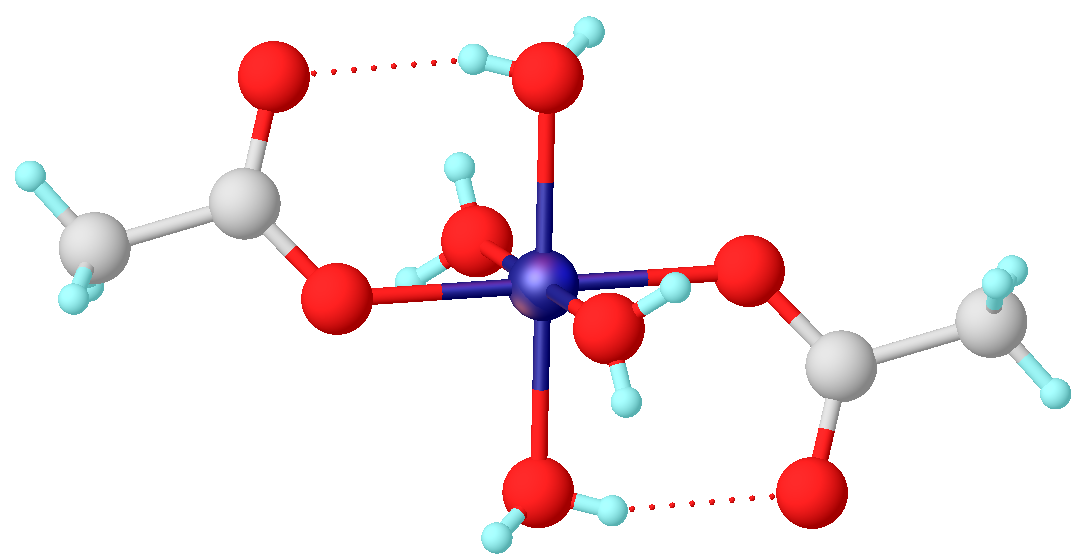
Structure of hydrated nickel acetate.

Transition metal carboxylate complexes are coordination complexes with carboxylate (RCO^{−}_{2}) ligands. Reflecting the diversity of carboxylic acids, the inventory of metal carboxylates is large. Many are useful commercially, and many have attracted intense scholarly scrutiny. Carboxylates exhibit a variety of coordination modes, most common are κ^{1} (O-monodentate), κ^{2} (O,O-bidentate), and bridging.

== Acetate and related monocarboxylates ==
=== Structure and bonding ===
Carboxylates bind to single metals by one or both oxygen atoms, the respective notation being κ^{1}- and κ^{2}-. In terms of electron counting, κ^{1}-carboxylates are "X"-type ligands, i.e., a pseudohalide-like. κ^{2}-carboxylates are "LX ligands", i.e. resembling the combination of a Lewis base (L) and a pseudohalide (X). Carboxylates are classified as hard ligands, in HSAB theory.

Structures of Selected Metal Acetates

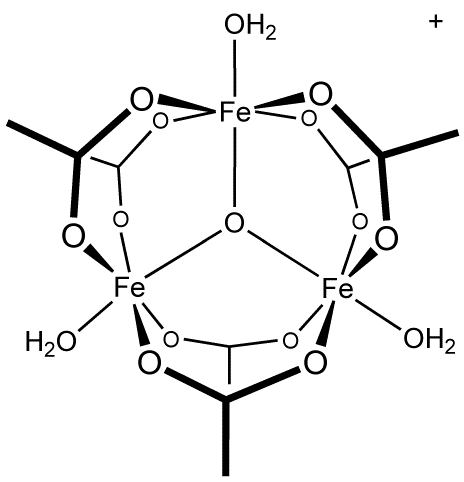
Basic ferric acetate

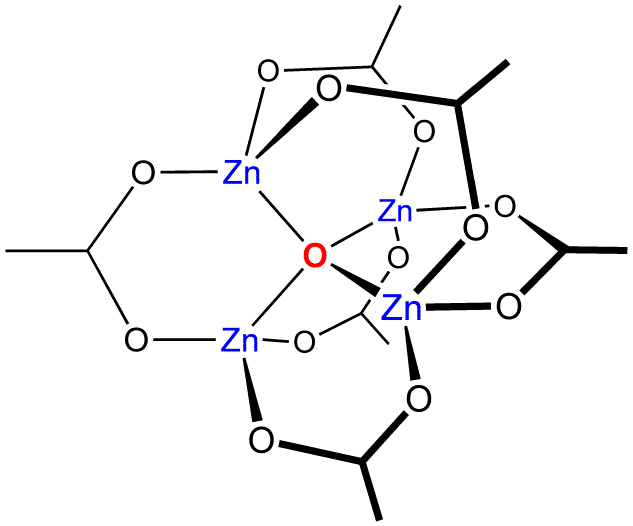
Basic zinc acetate

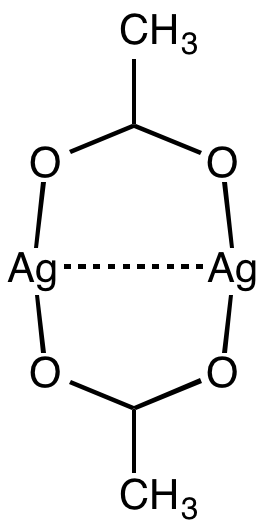
Silver acetate

Molybdenum(II) acetate, illustrating the Mo–Mo quadruple bond.

[CoO(acetate)]_{4}, the "Das cubane"

Segment of the Co(OAc)_{2}(H_{2}O) chain, illustrating two modes for bridging carboxylate ligands.

For simple carboxylates, the acetate complexes are illustrative. Most transition metal acetates are mixed ligand complexes. One common example is hydrated nickel acetate, Ni(O_{2}CCH_{3})_{2}(H_{2}O)_{4}, which features intramolecular hydrogen-bonding between the uncoordinated oxygens and the protons of aquo ligands. Stoichiometrically simple complexes are often multimetallic. One family are the basic metal acetates, of the stoichiometry [M_{3}O(OAc)_{6}(H_{2}O)_{3}]^{n+}.

=== Homoleptic complexes ===
Homoleptic carboxylate complexes are usually coordination polymers. But exceptions exist.

- A molecular monocarboxylate is silver acetate, Ag_{2}(OAc)_{2}.
- Molecular diacetates are more common. Several diacetates adopt the Chinese lantern structure. Well studied examples include the dimetal tetraacetates (M_{2}(OAc)_{4}) including rhodium(II) acetate, copper(II) acetate, molybdenum(II) acetate, and chromium(II) acetate. Platinum diacetate and palladium diacetate feature Pt_{4} and Pd_{3} cores, further illustrating the tendency of acetate ligands to stabilize multimetallic structures.
- Mononuclear tricarboxylates include derivatives of 1-adamantanecarboxylic acid, which have the formula [M(O_{2}CC_{10}H_{11})_{3}]^{−} (M = Co, Ni, Zn). The carboxylates are bidentate.

== Synthesis ==
Many methods allow the synthesis of metal carboxylates. From preformed carboxylic acid, the following routes have been demonstrated:

acid-base reactions: L_{n}MOR′ + RCO_{2}H → L_{n}MO_{2}CR + R′OH
protonolysis: L_{n}M(alkyl) + RCO_{2}H → L_{n}MO_{2}CR + alkane
oxidative addition: L_{n}M + RCO_{2}H → L_{n}(H)MO_{2}CR

From preformed carboxylate, salt metathesis reactions are common:

L_{n}MCl + RCO_{2}Na → L_{n}MO_{2}CR + NaCl

Some metal oxides react with acetic anhydride to give carboxylates, Examples include chromyl acetate (CrO_{2}(O_{2}CCH_{3})_{2}) and vanadyl acetate (VO(O_{2}CCH_{3})_{2}).

Metal carboxylates can be prepared by carboxylation of highly basic metal alkyls:

L_{n}MR + CO_{2} → L_{n}MO_{2}CR

== Reactions ==
A common reaction of metal carboxylates is their displacement by more basic ligands. Acetate is a common leaving group. They are especially prone to protonolysis, which is widely used to introduce ligands, displacing the carboxylic acid. In this way octachlorodimolybdate is produced from dimolybdenum tetraacetate:

Mo_{2}(O_{2}CCH_{3})_{4} + 4 HCl + 4 KCl → K_{4}[Mo_{2}Cl_{8}] + 4 CH_{3}CO_{2}H

Acetates of electrophilic metals are proposed to function as bases in concerted metalation deprotonation reactions.

Attempts to prepare some carboxylate complexes, especially for electrophilic metals, often gives oxo derivatives. Examples include the oxo-acetates of Fe(III), Mn(III), and Cr(III). Pyrolysis of metal carboxylates affords acid anhydrides and the metal oxide. This reaction explains the formation of basic zinc acetate from anhydrous zinc diacetate.

In some cases, monodentate carboxylates undergo O-alkylation to give esters. Strong alkylating agents are required.

== Other carboxylates ==
Many carboxylates form complexes with transition metals. Alkyl and simple aryl carboxylates behave similarly to the acetates. Trifluoroacetates differ in mononuclear complexes because it is usually monodentate, for example [Zn(κ^{2}-O_{2}CCH_{3})_{2}(OH_{2})_{2}] versus [Zn(κ^{1}-O_{2}CCF_{3})_{2}(OH_{2})_{4}].

== Applications ==
=== Metal naphthenates and ethylhexanoates ===
Structure of a representative naphthenic acid, which forms a variety of complexes with transition metals.

Naphthenic acids, mixtures of long chain and cyclic carboxylic acids extracted from petroleum, form lipophilic complexes (often called salts) with transition metals. These metal naphthenates have the formula M(naphthenate)_{2}, or M_{3}O(naphthenate)_{6}, have diverse applications including synthetic detergents, lubricants, corrosion inhibitors, fuel and lubricating oil additives, wood preservatives, insecticides, fungicides, acaricides, wetting agents, thickening agent, and oil drying agents. Industrially useful naphthenates include those of aluminium, magnesium, calcium, barium, cobalt, copper, lead, manganese, nickel, vanadium, and zinc. Illustrative is the use of cobalt naphthenate for the oxidation of tetrahydronaphthalene to the hydroperoxide.

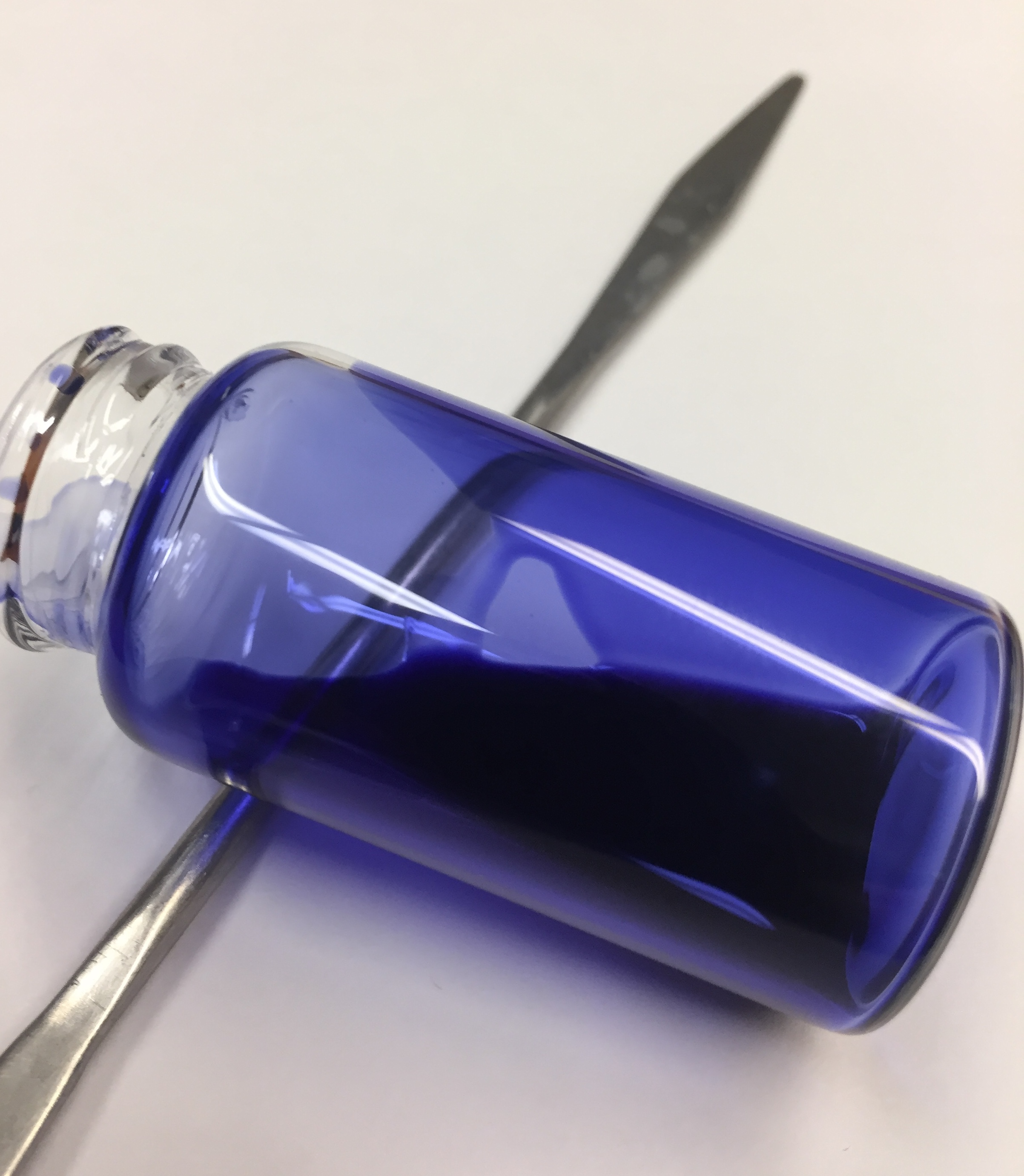
A 65% solution of cobalt(II) bis(2-ethylhexanoate) in mineral spirits, tilted vial to illustrate color and viscosity.

Like naphthenic acid, 2-ethylhexanoic acid forms lipophilic complexes that are used in organic and industrial chemical synthesis. They function as catalysts in polymerizations as well as for oxidation reactions as oil drying agents. Metal ethylhexanoates are referred to as metallic soaps.

=== Aminopolycarboxylates ===
Selected Complexes of Carboxylates
metal complex with the EDTA anion

Ferric bis(iminodiacetate)

Active site of hemerythrin, an O_{2}-carrying iron carboxylate

A commercially important family of metal carboxylates is derived from aminopolycarboxylates such as EDTA^{4−}. Related to these synthetic chelating agents are the amino acids, which form large families of amino acid complexes. Two amino acids, glutamate and aspartate, have carboxylate side chains, which function as ligands for iron in nonheme iron proteins, such as hemerythrin.

=== Metal organic frameworks (MOFs) ===
Metal organic frameworks, porous, three-dimensional coordination polymers, are often derived from metal carboxylate clusters. These clusters, called secondary bonding units (SBUs), are often linked by the conjugate bases of benzenedi- and -tricarboxylic acids.

=== Reagents for organic synthesis ===

It has been claimed that "cobalt carboxylates are the most widely used homogeneous catalysts in industry" as they are used in the oxidation of p-xylene to terephthalic acid.

Palladium(II) acetate has been described as being "among the most extensively used transition metal complexes in metal-mediated organic synthesis". Many coupling reactions utilize this reagent, which is soluble in organic solvents and which contains a built-in Bronsted base (acetate).

Dirhodium tetrakis(trifluoroacetate) is widely used catalyst for reactions involving diazo compounds.

== Spectroscopic characterization ==
The infrared spectrum of metal carboxylates is indicative of the bonding mode. Unidentate carboxylate ligands show ν_{CO} in the range 1605–1620 cm^{−1}. The value of ν_{CO} shifts to near 1580 cm^{−1} when the carboxylate is a bridging ligand.

== Related topics ==
- Transition metal oxalate complex
