= Metal–metal bond =

Interactions between metals in inorganic chemistry

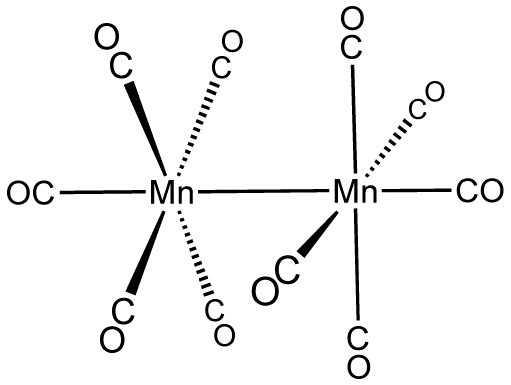
dimanganese decacarbonyl.

In inorganic chemistry, metal–metal bonds describe attractive interactions between metal centers. The simplest examples are found in bimetallic complexes. Metal–metal bonds can be "supported", i.e. be accompanied by one or more bridging ligands, or "unsupported". They can also vary according to bond order. The topic of metal–metal bonding is usually discussed within the framework of coordination chemistry, but the topic is related to extended metallic bonding, which describes interactions between metals in extended solids such as bulk metals and metal subhalides.

== Unsupported metal–metal bonds ==
An example of a metal–metal bond is found in dimanganese decacarbonyl, Mn_{2}(CO)_{10}. As confirmed by X-ray crystallography, a pair of Mn(CO)_{5} units are linked by a bond between the Mn atoms. The Mn-Mn distance (290 pm) is short. Mn_{2}(CO)_{10} is a simple and clear case of a metal-metal bond because no other atoms tie the two Mn atoms together.

When several metals are linked by metal-metal bonds, the compound or ion is called a metal cluster. Many metal clusters contain several unsupported M–M bonds. Some examples are M_{3}(CO)_{12} (M = Ru, Os) and Ir_{4}(CO)_{12}.

A subclass of unsupported metal–metal bonded arrays are linear chain compounds. In such cases the M–M bonding is weak as signaled by longer M–M bonds and the tendency of such compounds to dissociate in solution.

== Supported metal–metal bonds ==
In many compounds, metal-metal bonds are accompanied by bridging ligands. In those cases, it is difficult to state unequivocably that the metal-metal bond is the cohesive force binding the two metals together. Diiron nonacarbonyl is such an example. Another example of a supported metal–metal bond is cyclopentadienyliron dicarbonyl dimer, [(C_{5}H_{5})Fe(CO)_{2}]_{2}. In the predominant isomers of this complex, the two Fe centers are joined not only by an Fe–Fe bond, but also by bridging CO ligands. The related cyclopentadienylruthenium dicarbonyl dimer features an unsupported Ru–Ru bond. Many metal clusters contain several supported M–M bonds. Further examples are Fe_{3}(CO)_{12} and Co_{4}(CO)_{12}.

== Multiple metal–metal bonds ==
Nb_{2}Cl_{6}(SMe_{2})_{3}, featuring a metal–metal double bond.

Chromium(II) acetate, featuring a metal–metal quadruple bond.

[Ru_{2}(OAc)_{4}Cl]_{n}, where the metal–metal bond order is 2.5.

In addition to M–M single bonds, metal pairs can be linked by double, triple, quadruple, and in a few cases, quintuple bonds. Isolable complexes with multiple bonds are most common among the transition metals in the middle of the d-block, such as rhenium, tungsten, technetium, molybdenum and chromium. Typical the coligands are π-donors, not π-acceptors. Well studied examples are the tetraacetates, such as dimolybdenum tetraacetate (quadruple bond) and dirhodium tetraacetate (single bond). Mixed-valence druthenium tetraacetates have fractional M–M bond orders, i.e., 2.5 for [Ru_{2}(OAc)_{4}(H_{2}O)_{2}]^{+}.

The complexes Nb_{2}X_{6}(SR_{2})_{3} adopt a face-sharing bioctahedral structures (X = Cl, Br; SR_{2} = thioether). As dimers of Nb(III), they feature double metal–metal bonds, the maximum possible for a pair of metals with d^{2} configuration. Hexa(tert-butoxy)ditungsten(III) is a well studied example of a complex with a metal–metal triple bond.
