= Chromium acetate hydroxide =

Chromium(III) acetate hydroxide

Names
- IUPAC name Chromium(III) acetate hydroxide
- Other names Acetic acid of the chromium salt, Chromium(III)acetatehydroxide,Cr24%, Chromic acetate hydroxide, Chromium - acetic acid (3:7) dihydrate, Chromium Acetic Acid, Ccris 6345,

Identifiers
| CAS Number | 263752-31-4 |
| 3D model (JSmol) | Interactive image |
| ECHA InfoCard | 100.049.480 |
| EC Number | 254-447-3 |
| CompTox Dashboard (EPA) | DTXSID6044935 |
- InChI: InChI=1S/12C2H4O2.8Cr.12H2O/c12*1-2(3)4;;;;;;;;;;;;;;;;;;;;/h12*1H3,(H,3,4);;;;;;;;;12*1H2/q;;;;;;;;;;;;8*+3;;;;;;;;;;;;/p-24 Key: GEJBKRAUTRHOTI-UHFFFAOYSA-A
- SMILES: CC(=O)[O-].CC(=O)[O-].CC(=O)[O-].CC(=O)[O-].CC(=O)[O-].CC(=O)[O-].CC(=O)[O-].CC(=O)[O-].CC(=O)[O-].CC(=O)[O-].CC(=O)[O-].CC(=O)[O-].[OH-].[OH-].[OH-].[OH-].[OH-].[OH-].[OH-].[OH-].[OH-].[OH-].[OH-].[OH-].[Cr+3].[Cr+3].[Cr+3].[Cr+3].[Cr+3].[Cr+3].[Cr+3].[Cr+3]

Properties
| Chemical formula | C_{24}H_{48}Cr_{8}O_{36} |
| Molar mass | 1328.581 g·mol^{−1} |
| Appearance | violet solid |
| Density | 1.484 g/cm^{3} |
| Solubility in water | soluble |

Hazards
- Occupational safety and health (OHS/OSH)
| Main hazards | Harmful by inhalation, in contact with skin and if swallowed, Irritating to eyes, respiratory system and skin |
- GHS labelling
| Pictograms | (GHS07: Exclamation mark) |
| Signal word | Warning |
| Hazard statements | H302, H312, H315, H317, H319, H332, H335 |
| Safety data sheet (SDS) | MSDS |
- Except where otherwise noted, data are given for materials in their standard state (at 25 °C [77 °F], 100 kPa). verify (what is ?) Infobox references

Chromium acetate hydroxide is the coordination complex with the formula [Cr_{2}(OH)_{3}(OAc)_{3}]_{4}. A dark violet solid, it crystallizes as the triacontatetrahydrate (34 molecules of water of crystallization). It is water-soluble.

== Structure ==
The complex is a tetramer of binuclear Cr_{2}(OH)_{3}(OAc)_{3}. The subunits are linked by acetate and hydroxide ligands. The oxidation state of chromium is +3, which explains the stability of the complex since octahedral d^{3} ions give kinetically robust complexes. Overall, the complex's structure is unusual compared to other transition metal carboxylate complexes.

== See also ==
- Chromium(II) acetate
- Chromium(III) acetate
