= Chromium acetylacetonate =

Chromium acetylacetonate may refer to:

- Chromium(II) acetylacetonate (chromium diacetylacetonate), Cr(C_{5}H_{7}O_{2})_{2}
- Chromium(III) acetylacetonate (chromium triacetylacetonate), Cr(C_{5}H_{7}O_{2})_{3}
