= Rhodium(II) acetate =

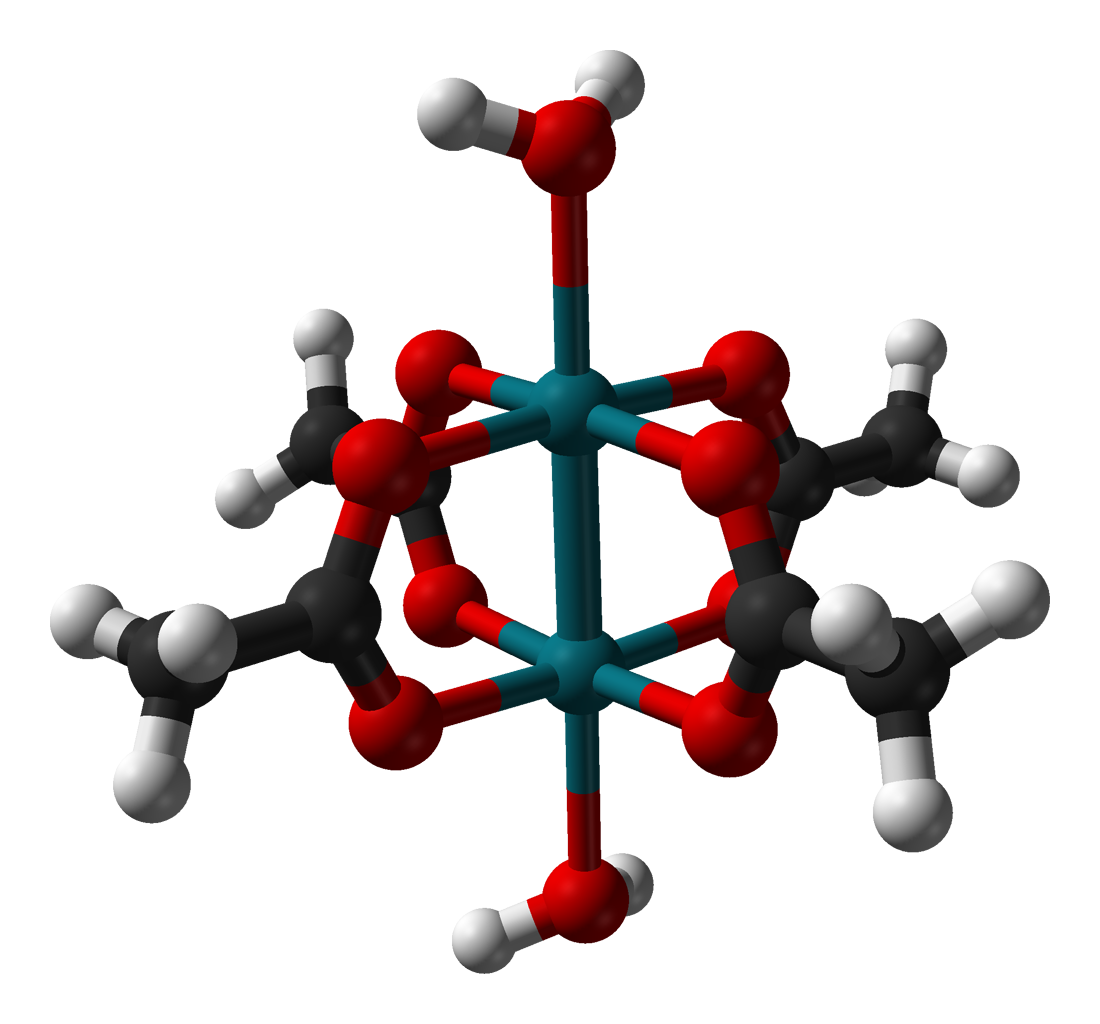

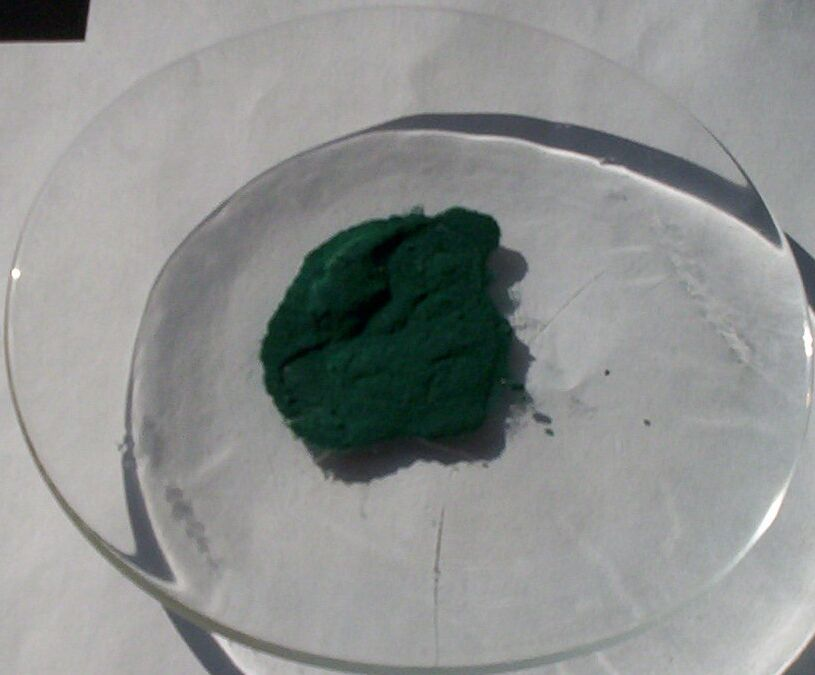

Names
- IUPAC name Rhodium(II) acetate
- Other names Dirhodium tetraacetate, Tetrakis(acetato)dirhodium(II), Rhodium diacetate dimer, Tetrakis(μ-acetato)dirhodium

Identifiers
CAS Number	15956-28-2
3D model (JSmol)	Interactive image
ChemSpider	20370
ECHA InfoCard	100.036.425
EC Number	240-084-8
PubChem CID	152122
RTECS number	VI9361000
UNII	NK3058Z56X
CompTox Dashboard (EPA)	DTXSID201314246
- InChI: InChI=1S/2C2H4O2.Rh/c2*1-2(3)4;/h2*1H3,(H,3,4);/q;;+2/p-2 Key: ITDJKCJYYAQMRO-UHFFFAOYSA-L; InChI=1S/4C2H4O2.2Rh/c4*1-2(3)4;;/h4*1H3,(H,3,4);;/q;;;;2*+2/p-4 Key: : SYBXSZMNKDOUCA-UHFFFAOYSA-J
- SMILES: [OH2][Rh+3]1234#[Rh+3]([OH2])(O[C-](C)O1)(O[C-](C)O2)(O[C-](C)O3)O[C-](C)O4

Properties
Chemical formula	C_{8}H_{12}O_{8}Rh_{2}
Molar mass	441.99 g/mol
Appearance	Emerald green powder
Density	1.126 g/cm^{3}
Melting point	>100 °C
Boiling point	decomposes
Solubility in water	soluble
Solubility in other solvents	polar organic solvents

Structure
Crystal structure	monoclinic
Coordination geometry	octahedral
Dipole moment	0 D

Hazards
- GHS labelling
Pictograms	(GHS07: Exclamation mark)
Signal word	Warning
Hazard statements	H315, H319
Precautionary statements	P264, P280, P302+P352, P305+P351+P338, P321, P332+P313, P337+P313, P362
NFPA 704 (fire diamond)	3 0 0
Flash point	low flammability
Safety data sheet (SDS)	Coleparmer MSDS

Related compounds
Related compounds	Copper(II) acetate Chromium(II) acetate
- Except where otherwise noted, data are given for materials in their standard state (at 25 °C [77 °F], 100 kPa). verify (what is ?) Infobox references

Rhodium(II) acetate is the coordination compound with the formula Rh_{2}(AcO)_{4}, where AcO^{−} is the acetate ion (CH_{3}CO^{−}_{2}). This dark green powder is slightly soluble in polar solvents, including water. It is used as a catalyst for cyclopropanation of alkenes. It is a widely studied example of a transition metal carboxylate complex.

== Structure ==
The structure of rhodium(II) acetate features a pair of rhodium atoms, each with octahedral molecular geometry, defined by four acetate oxygen atoms, water, and a Rh–Rh bond of length 2.39 Å. The water adduct is exchangeable, and a variety of other Lewis bases bind to the axial positions. Copper(II) acetate and chromium(II) acetate adopt similar structures.

== Preparation ==
Rhodium(II) acetate is usually prepared by the heating of hydrated rhodium(III) chloride in a methanol-acetic acid mixture. The crude product is the bis(methanol) complex, but it is easily desolvated.

== Reactions ==
The dimer binds a number of classical Lewis bases to form 2:1 adducts:

Its Lewis acidity is eclipsed by the enhanced reactivity of rhodium(II) trifluoroacetate, which even binds arenes and alkenes.

The acetate group can be replaced by other carboxylates of strong acids. The yields are nearly quantitative.

Like almost all rhodium complexes, rhodium(II) acetate catalyzes many reactions such as hydrogenation and hydrosilylation. No evidence exists for mechanisms and the behavior has not motivated further work. The important observation that rhodium(II) acetate catalyzes reactions of diazo compounds has led to considerable research, but mostly focused on the trifluoroacetate or chiral derivatives.
