= Das cubane =

Names
- Other names tetrakis[μ-(acetato-κO:κO')]tetra-μ_{3}-oxotetrakis(pyridine)tetracobalt

Identifiers
CAS Number	209162-45-8
3D model (JSmol)	Interactive image
- InChI: InChI=1S/4C5H5N.4C2H4O2.4Co.4O/c4*1-2-4-6-5-3-1;4*1-2(3)4;;;;;;;;/h4*1-5H;4*1H3,(H,3,4);;;;;;;;/q;;;;;;;;4*+1;;;;/p-4 Key: JIRPTERIJDAISX-UHFFFAOYSA-J
- SMILES: [Co+]=O.[Co+]=O.[Co+]=O.[Co+]=O.n1ccccc1.n1ccccc1.n1ccccc1.n1ccccc1.CC(=O)[O-].CC(=O)[O-].CC(=O)[O-].CC(=O)[O-]

Properties
Chemical formula	C_{28}H_{32}Co_{4}N_{4}O_{12}
Molar mass	852.313 g·mol^{−1}
Appearance	olive green solid
- Except where otherwise noted, data are given for materials in their standard state (at 25 °C [77 °F], 100 kPa). Infobox references

The Das cubane is a transition metal carboxylate complex with the formula [CoO(OAc)py]_{4} where OAc is acetate and py is pyridine. The compound is named after Birinchi K. Das, who led the team that discovered the cluster. The compound features a Co_{4}O_{4} cubane-type cluster core. Each Co(III) center is low-spin and has octahedral geometry. The compound is prepared by mixing a cobalt(II) salt with acetate and pyridine followed by oxidation with hydrogen peroxide. This compound has attracted interest as a possible catalyst for the oxidation of xylene to terephthalic acid.
