= Rhodium(II) trifluoroacetate =

Names
- Other names: Dirhodium tetrakis(trifluoroacetate); Dirhodium tetra(trifluoroacetate); Rhodium(II) trifluoroacetate dimer

Identifiers
CAS Number	31126-95-1
3D model (JSmol)	Interactive image
ChemSpider	380904
ECHA InfoCard	100.159.403
EC Number	631-136-4
PubChem CID	10985187
- InChI: InChI=1S/4C2HF3O2.2Rh/c4*3-2(4,5)1(6)7;;/h4*(H,6,7);; Key: SZQVMUPTZFMHQT-UHFFFAOYSA-N
- SMILES: C(=O)(C(F)(F)F)O.C(=O)(C(F)(F)F)O.C(=O)(C(F)(F)F)O.C(=O)(C(F)(F)F)O.[Rh].[Rh]

Properties
Chemical formula	C_{8}F_{12}O_{8}Rh_{2}
Molar mass	657.872 g·mol^{−1}
Appearance	green solid

Hazards
- GHS labelling
Pictograms	(GHS07: Exclamation mark)
Signal word	Warning
Hazard statements	H315, H319, H335
Precautionary statements	P261, P264, P264+P265, P271, P280, P302+P352, P304+P340, P305+P351+P338, P319, P321, P332+P317, P337+P317, P362+P364, P403+P233, P405, P501
- Except where otherwise noted, data are given for materials in their standard state (at 25 °C [77 °F], 100 kPa). Infobox references

Rhodium trifluoroacetate is the chemical compound with the formula Rh_{2}(O_{2}CCF_{3})_{4}. It is used as a catalyst in the synthesis of some organic compounds.

== Structure ==
The compound and its derivatives have been extensively characterized by X-ray crystallography. It adopts the Chinese lantern structure seen for many dimetal carboxylate complexes. This structure accommodates a Rh-Rh bond, the existence of which explains the diamagnetism of this Rh(II) species. The Rh-Rh distance is 238 pm.

== Preparation ==
The anhydrous complex is a green volatile solid. It is prepared by dissolving rhodium(II) acetate in hot trifluoroacetic acid:

Rh_{2}(O_{2}CCH_{3})_{4} + 4 HO_{2}CCF_{3} → Rh_{2}(O_{2}CCF_{3})_{4} + 4 HO_{2}CCH_{3}

This reaction expels acetic acid. The Rh-Rh bond is retained.

== Reactions ==
Rhodium(II) trifluoroacetate forms adducts with a variety of Lewis bases. The structures typically have a 2:1 stoichiometry, with one base binding at the "axial" position on each of the two Rh(II) centers:

Rh_{2}(O_{2}CCF_{3})_{4} + 2 L → Rh_{2}(O_{2}CCF_{3})_{4}L_{2} (L = CO, RCN, R_{2}SO, R_{3}P, ...)

Rhodium(II) trifluoroacetate binds even very weak bases, moreso than does rhodium(II) acetate. It even forms adducts with hexamethylbenzene and with S_{8}.

Rhodium(II) trifluoroacetate catalyzes cyclopropanation of alkenes by diazo compounds:

RCH=CR'H + CH_{3}CH_{2}O_{2}CCH(N_{2}) → cyclo−(RCH)(R'CH)(CH_{3}CH_{2}O_{2}CCH) + N_{2}
