= Diruthenium tetraacetate chloride =

Names
- IUPAC name Ruthenium(II,III) acetate chloride
- Other names Tetrakis(mu-(acetato-O:O'))chlorodiruthenium

Identifiers
CAS Number	38833-34-0
3D model (JSmol)	Interactive image
ChemSpider	64886095
EC Number	254-144-6
PubChem CID	76871777
- InChI: InChI=1S/4C2H4O2.ClH.2Ru/c4*1-2(3)4;;;/h4*1H3,(H,3,4);1H;;/q;;;;;;+1/p-1 Key: LLHUCACCCSUOKG-UHFFFAOYSA-M
- SMILES: CC(=O)O.CC(=O)O.CC(=O)O.CC(=O)O.Cl[Ru].[Ru]

Properties
Chemical formula	C_{8}H_{12}ClO_{8}Ru_{2}
Molar mass	473.77 g·mol^{−1}
Appearance	red-brown solid
- Except where otherwise noted, data are given for materials in their standard state (at 25 °C [77 °F], 100 kPa). Infobox references

Diruthenium tetraacetate chloride is the coordination polymer with the formula {[Ru_{2}(O_{2}CCH_{3})_{4}]Cl}_{n}. A red brown solid, the compound is obtained by the reduction of ruthenium trichloride in acetic acid. The compound has attracted much academic interest because it features a fractional metal-metal bond order of 2.5.

The [Ru_{2}(O_{2}CCH_{3})_{4}]^{+} core adopts the Chinese lantern structure, with four acetate ligands spanning the Ru_{2} center. The Ru-Ru distance is 228 pm. The [Ru_{2}(O_{2}CCH_{3})_{4}]^{+} units are linked by bridging chloride ligands.
