= Copper(I) acetate =

Chemical compound

Identifiers
| CAS Number | 598-54-9 |
| 3D model (JSmol) | Interactive image |
| ChemSpider | 62245 |
| ECHA InfoCard | 100.009.036 |
| EC Number | 209-938-7 |
| PubChem CID | 69023 |
| UNII | 9U3N93LMZB |
| CompTox Dashboard (EPA) | DTXSID0060511 |
- InChI: InChI=1S/C2H4O2.Cu/c1-2(3)4;/h1H3,(H,3,4);/q;+1/p-1 Key: RFKZUAOAYVHBOY-UHFFFAOYSA-M
- SMILES: CC(=O)[O-].[Cu+]

Properties
| Chemical formula | C_{2}H_{3}CuO_{2} |
| Molar mass | 122.590 g·mol^{−1} |
| Appearance | tan or white solid |
| Density | 2.52 g/cm^{3} |
| Melting point | 285 °C (545 °F; 558 K) (decomposes) |
| Solubility in water | hydrolyzes forming Cu_{2}O |
| Solubility | soluble in pyridine, acetic acid dissolves slowly in ether |

Structure
| Crystal structure | monoclinic |
| Space group | P2_{1}/m (No. 11) |
| Lattice constant | a = 5.221 Å, b = 6.259 Å, c = 9.928 Å α = 90°, β = 93.63°, γ = 90° |

Hazards
- GHS labelling
| Pictograms | (GHS07: Exclamation mark) |
| Signal word | Warning |
| Hazard statements | H315, H319, H335 |
| Precautionary statements | P261, P264, P264+P265, P271, P280, P302+P352, P304+P340, P305+P351+P338, P319, P321, P332+P317, P337+P317, P362+P364, P403+P233, P405, P501 |
- Except where otherwise noted, data are given for materials in their standard state (at 25 °C [77 °F], 100 kPa). Infobox references

Copper(I) acetate (cuprous acetate) is an organic copper salt of acetic acid with chemical formula CH_{3}COOCu. It is an air-sensitive white solid.

== Synthesis ==
Copper(I) acetate is produced by the reduction of anhydrous copper(II) acetate with copper metal in acetonitrile or pyridine. The reaction is performed under vacuum to prevent oxidation of the product.

It can also be prepared by treating copper(I) oxide with an acetic acid–acetic anhydride solution.

== Uses ==
Copper(I) acetate is used as a catalyst for the oxidation of phenols to the corresponding poly-(phenylene) ethers and diphenoquinones in the presence of tertiary amines.

It also catalyzes azide-alkyne cycloaddition reactions.

== Reactions ==
Copper(I) acetate reacts with primary, secondary, tertiary, allylic and vinylic halides and tosylates yielding the corresponding acetate esters. The reaction is performed in refluxing pyridine, under an inert atmosphere and anhydrous conditions.

It forms complexes with many unidentate and bidentate sigma donor ligands.
