= Chinese lantern structure =

Coordination complex where two metal atoms are bridged by four bidentate ligands

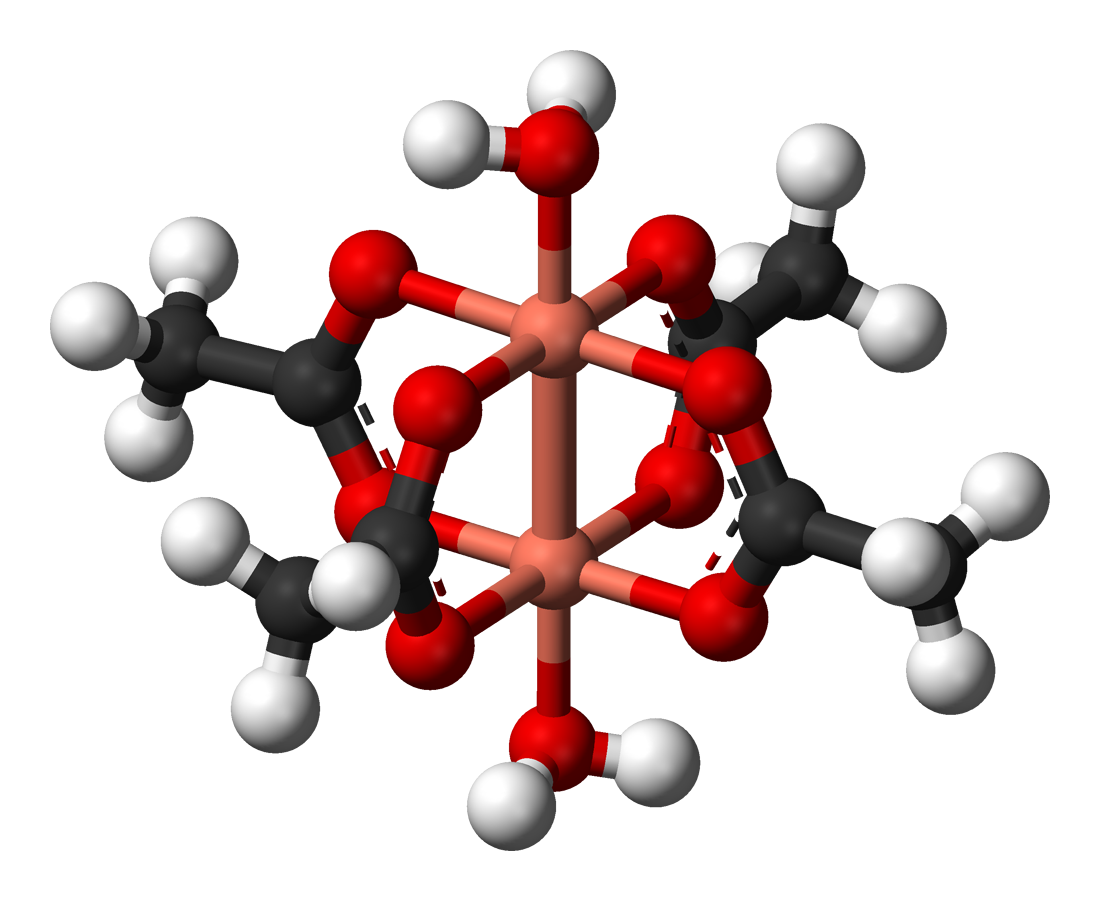
The Chinese lantern structure adopted by dirhodium tetraacetate dihydrate

In chemistry, the Chinese lantern structure is a coordination complex where two metal atoms are bridged by four bidentate ligands. This structure type is also known as a paddlewheel complex. Examples include chromium(II) acetate, molybdenum(II) acetate, and rhodium(II) acetate, copper(II) acetate dihydrate. The name is derived from the resemblance between the structure and a Chinese paper lantern. Often additional ligands are bound to the metal centers along the M---M vector. The degree of metal-metal bonding varies according to the d-electron configuration.

== Complexes with Chinese lantern structure ==
- Copper benzoate
- Copper acetate
- Chromium(II) acetate
- Molybdenum(II) acetate
- Diruthenium tetraacetate chloride
- Rhodium acetate
- Potassium diplatinum(II) tetrakispyrophosphite
