= Molybdenum(II) acetate =

Names
- Other names Dimolybdenum tetraacetate, tetra(aceto) dimolybdenum, Molybdenum(II) acetate dimer

Identifiers
CAS Number	14221-06-8
3D model (JSmol)	Interactive image
ChemSpider	76023
ECHA InfoCard	100.034.611
EC Number	238-089-5
PubChem CID	84269
CompTox Dashboard (EPA)	DTXSID90161972
- InChI: InChI=1S/4C2H4O2.2Mo/c4*1-2(3)4;;/h4*1H3,(H,3,4);;/q;;;;2*+2/p-4 Key: DOOLFANBWPPEGQ-UHFFFAOYSA-J
- SMILES: [Mo-2]1234#[Mo-2]([O+]=C(C)O1)([O+]=C(C)O2)(OC(C)=[O+]3)OC(C)=[O+]4

Properties
Chemical formula	Mo_{2}(CH_{3}COO)_{4}
Molar mass	428.1010 g/mol
Appearance	Yellow solids
Boiling point	decomposes
Solubility in water	not soluble

Hazards
- GHS labelling
Pictograms	(GHS07: Exclamation mark)
Signal word	Warning
Hazard statements	H315, H319
Precautionary statements	P222, P231, P235, P305+P351+P338, P422, P501
Safety data sheet (SDS)	External MSDS

Related compounds
Related compounds	Copper(II) acetate Chromium(II) acetate
- Except where otherwise noted, data are given for materials in their standard state (at 25 °C [77 °F], 100 kPa). verify (what is ?) Infobox references

Molybdenum(II) acetate is a coordination compound with the formula Mo_{2}(CH_{3}COO)_{4}. It is a yellow, diamagnetic, air-stable solid that is slightly soluble in organic solvents. Molybdenum(II) acetate is an iconic example of a compound with a metal-metal quadruple bond.

== Structure ==
Like several other transition metal carboxylate complexes, Mo_{2}(CH_{3}COO)_{4} adopts a Chinese lantern structure. Each Mo(II) center in Mo_{2}(CH_{3}COO)_{4} has four d valence electrons. These eight d-electrons form one σ, two π bonds, and one δ bond, creating a bonding electron configuration of σ^{2}π^{4}δ^{2}. Each of these bonds are formed by the overlapping of pairs of d orbitals. The four acetate groups bridge the two metal centers. The Mo-O bond between each Mo(II) center and O atom from acetate has a distance of 2.119 Å, and the Mo-Mo distance between the two metal centers is 2.0934 Å.

== Preparation ==
Mo_{2}(CH_{3}COO)_{4} is prepared by treating molybdenum hexacarbonyl (Mo(CO)_{6}) with acetic acid. The process strips CO ligands from the hexacarbonyl and results in the oxidation of Mo(0) to Mo(II).

2 Mo(CO)_{6} + 4 CH_{3}COOH → Mo_{2}(CH_{3}COO)_{4} + 12 CO + 2 H_{2}

Trinuclear clusters are byproducts.

The reaction of CH_{3}COOH and 2 Mo(CO)_{6} was first investigated by Bannister et al. in 1960. At the time, quadruple metal-metal bonds had not yet been discovered, so these authors proposed that "Mo(CH_{3}COO)_{2}" was tetrahedral. This perspective changed with Mason's characterization.

== Applications ==
Mo_{2}(CH_{3}COO)_{4} is generally used as an intermediate compound in a process to form other quadruply bonded molybdenum compounds. The acetate ligands can be replaced to give new compounds such as Mo_{2}Cl_{8}^{4−} and Mo_{2}Cl_{4}(P(C_{4}H_{9})_{3})_{4}.
