= Vanadyl acetate =

Names
- Other names: Vanadyl(IV) acetate; Vanadium(IV) oxide diacetate

Identifiers
CAS Number	3473-84-5
3D model (JSmol)	Interactive image
ChemSpider	35294250
ECHA InfoCard	100.020.406
EC Number	222-445-1
PubChem CID	77024
CompTox Dashboard (EPA)	DTXSID001311115
- InChI: InChI=1S/2C2H4O2.O.V/c2*1-2(3)4;;/h2*1H3,(H,3,4);;
- SMILES: CC(=O)O.CC(=O)O.O=[V]

Properties
Chemical formula	VO(CH_{3}COO)_{2}
Molar mass	185.03 g/mol
Appearance	tan solid
Density	1.83 g/cm^{3}
Melting point	214 °C (417 °F; 487 K) (decomposes)
Solubility in water	Insoluble
Solubility	Insoluble

Structure
Crystal structure	Orthorhombic
Space group	Cmc2_{1}
Lattice constant	a = 14.07 Å, b = 6.88 Å, c = 6.93 Å
Lattice volume (V)	859.8 Å^{3}
Coordination geometry	octahedral (vanadium)

Related compounds
Other anions	Vanadyl acetylacetonate
- Except where otherwise noted, data are given for materials in their standard state (at 25 °C [77 °F], 100 kPa). Infobox references

Vanadyl acetate is the coordination polymer with the empirical formula VO(CH_{3}COO)_{2}, which can be simplified to VO(OAc)_{2} and giving rise to a systematic name of vanadium(IV) oxide diacetate. It is a tan solid, insoluble in most solvents.

== Production and structure ==
Vanadyl acetate is produced by treating vanadium pentoxide with acetic anhydride. The acetic anhydride serves as the reducing agent converting the vanadium(V) to vanadium(IV); the oxidized byproduct of the reaction has not been identified.

V_{2}O_{5} + 3 (CH_{3}CO)_{2}O → 2 VO(CH_{3}COO)_{2} + 2 CO_{2} + ...

This compound has a linear polymeric structure consisting of repeating VO_{6} octahedra.

It forms adducts with pyridine, urea, and thiourea. It also has been reported to catalyzes the acetylation of alcohols.
