= Chromium(III) acetylacetonate =

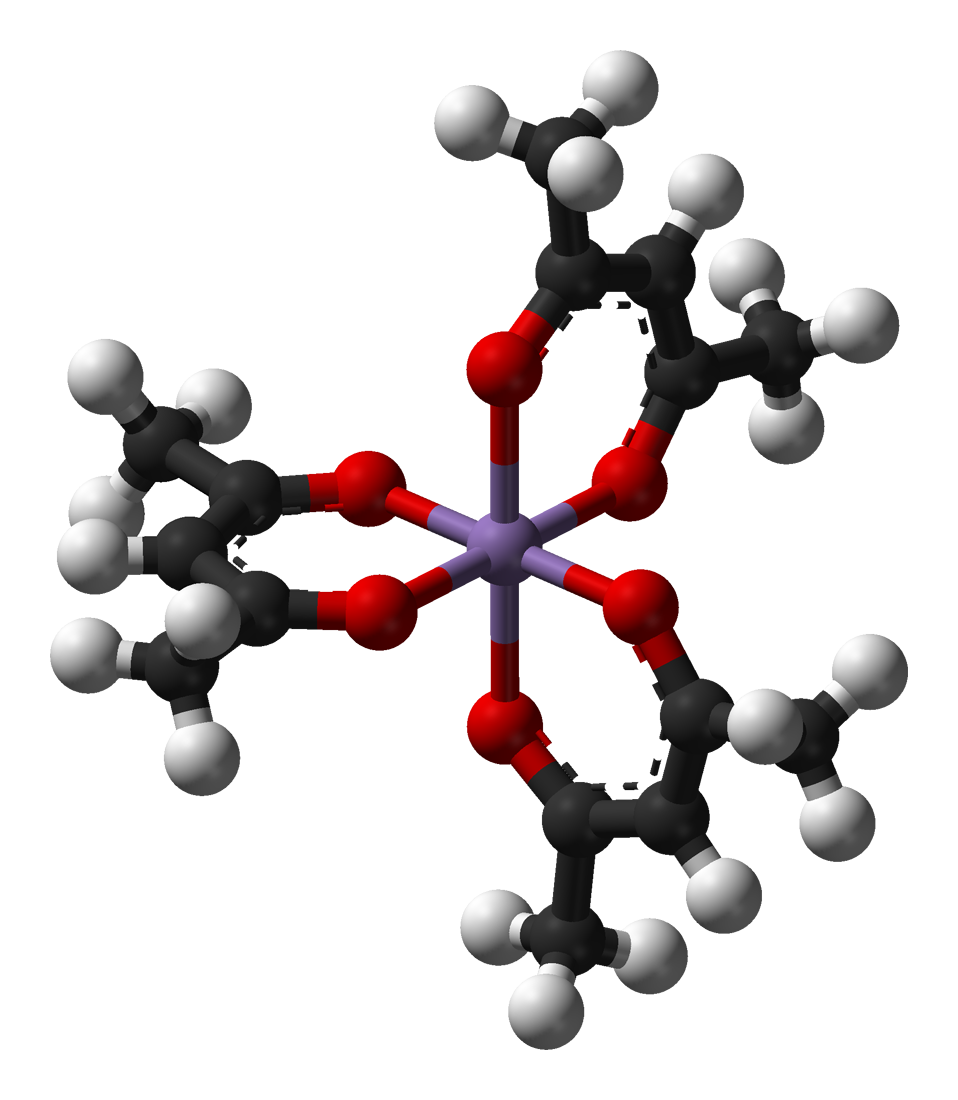

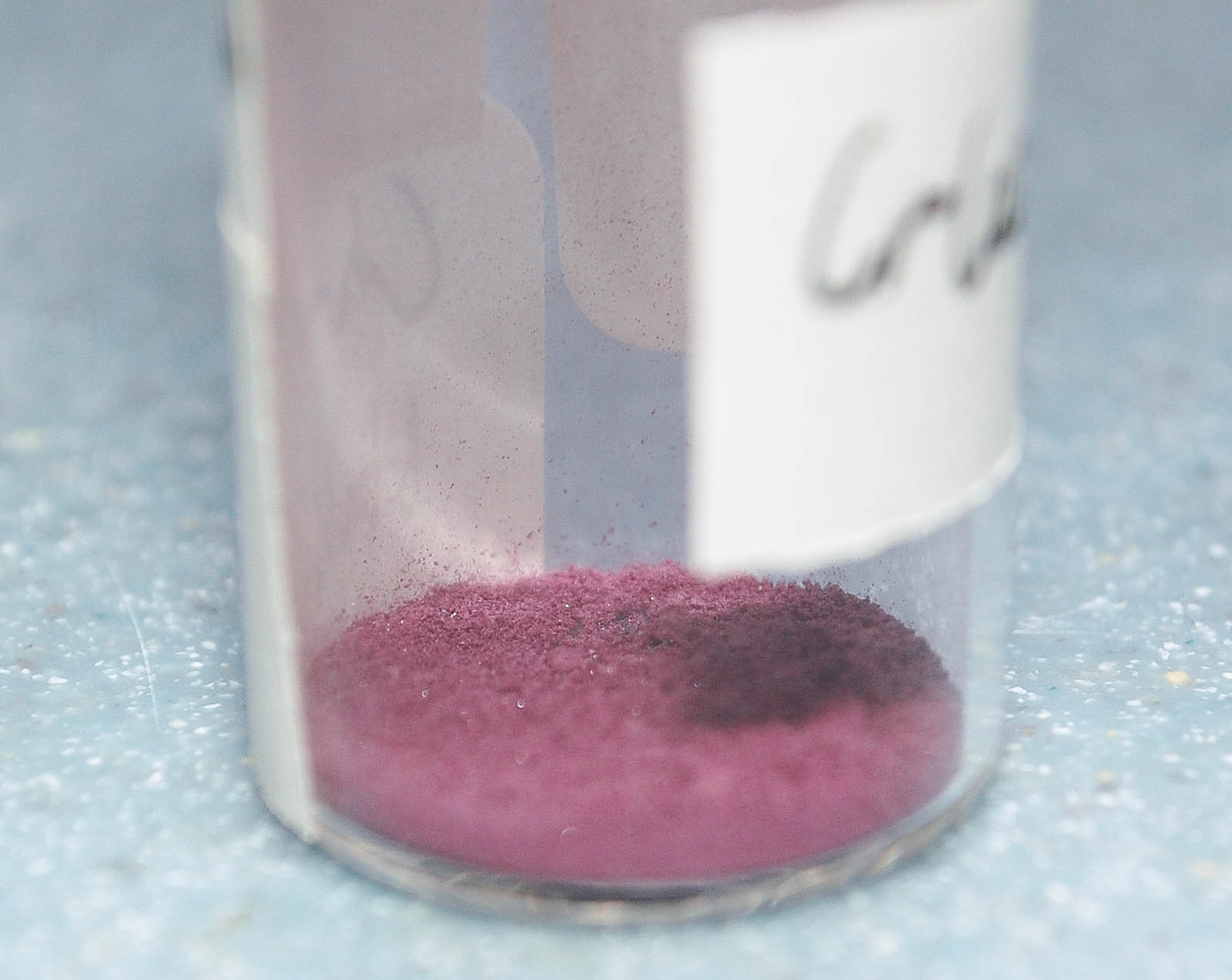
- Solid chromium(III) acetylacetonate

Names
- IUPAC name Tris(acetylacetonato)chromium(III)
- Systematic IUPAC name Tris[(Z)-4-oxopent-2-en-2-olato-κ^{2}O,O′]chromium(III)
- Other names Tris(2,4-pentanediono)chromium(III), Cr(acac)_{3}, Cr(pd)_{3}

Identifiers
CAS Number	21679-31-2
3D model (JSmol)	Interactive image
ChEBI	CHEBI:33035
ChemSpider	2006256
ECHA InfoCard	100.040.463
EC Number	244-526-0
PubChem CID	24884255
CompTox Dashboard (EPA)	DTXSID0051863
- InChI: InChI=1S/3C5H7O2.Cr/c3*1-4(6)3-5(2)7;/h3*3H,1-2H3;/q3*-1;+3 Key: GMJCSPGGZSWVKI-UHFFFAOYSA-N; InChI=1/3C5H7O2.Cr/c3*1-4(6)3-5(2)7;/h3*3H,1-2H3;/q3*-1;+3 Key: GMJCSPGGZSWVKI-UHFFFAOYAF
- SMILES: [Cr+3].O=C([CH-]C(=O)C)C.O=C([CH-]C(=O)C)C.O=C([CH-]C(=O)C)C

Properties
Chemical formula	Cr(C_{5}H_{7}O_{2})_{3}
Molar mass	349.32
Appearance	deep maroon
Density	1.34 g/cm^{3}
Melting point	210 °C (410 °F; 483 K)
Boiling point	340 °C (644 °F; 613 K) (sublimes near 110°C)
Solubility in non-polar organic solvents	soluble

Hazards
- GHS labelling
Pictograms	(GHS07: Exclamation mark)
Signal word	Warning
Hazard statements	H315, H319, H335
Precautionary statements	P261, P264, P271, P280, P302+P352, P304+P340, P305+P351+P338, P312, P321, P332+P313, P337+P313, P362, P403+P233, P405, P501

Related compounds
Related compounds	Chromium(II) acetylacetonate
- Except where otherwise noted, data are given for materials in their standard state (at 25 °C [77 °F], 100 kPa). verify (what is ?) Infobox references

Chromium(III) acetylacetonate is the coordination compound with the formula Cr(C_{5}H_{7}O_{2})_{3}, sometimes designated as Cr(acac)_{3}. This purplish coordination complex is used in NMR spectroscopy as a relaxation agent because of its solubility in nonpolar organic solvents and its paramagnetism.

== Synthesis, structure, bonding ==
The compound is prepared by the reaction of chromium(III) oxide with acetylacetone (Hacac):

Cr_{2}O_{3} + 6 Hacac → 2 Cr(acac)_{3} + 3 H_{2}O

The complex has idealized D_{3} symmetry. The Cr-O distances are 1.93 Å. The complex has been resolved into individual enantiomers by separation of its adduct with dibenzoyltartrate.

Like many other Cr(III) compounds, it has a quartet ground state, meaning that it has three unpaired electrons. This situation is consistent with the electronic configuration (t_{2g})^{3}(e_{g})^{0}. The color of the complex arises from d-d electronic transitions.

The complex is relatively inert toward substitution (hence it is susceptible to optical resolution). It reacts with a variety of electrophiles at the 3-positions of the chelate rings, giving the corresponding bromo-, nitro-, and formyl-substituted derivatives.

== Use in NMR ==
Cr(acac)_{3} is paramagnetic, a property which is often detrimental for NMR spectroscopy as the spin-lattice relaxation times are very short, leading to excessively broad peaks. However, this can be put to advantage in the right circumstances, particularly quantitative 13C NMR, where it acts as a paramagnetic relaxation agent.

The spin-lattice relaxation times for diamagnetic nuclei can be variable. In particular, ^{13}C quaternary carbons suffer from low signal intensity due to long relaxation times and lack of enhancement from the Nuclear Overhauser effect. To circumvent the first issue, the addition of a small quantity (on the order of 0.1 mM) of Cr(acac)_{3} to an NMR sample reduces the relaxation time by providing an alternative relaxation pathway - namely through the unpaired electron. By reducing the relaxation time, more scans can be acquired in a given amount of time, resulting in higher signal intensity. This is particularly advantageous for quantitative ^{13}C NMR, which requires that all signals have fully relaxed between pulses. By reducing the relaxation time, the delay between pulses can be reduced without affecting the relative integrations of peaks.
