= Chromium(III) acetate =

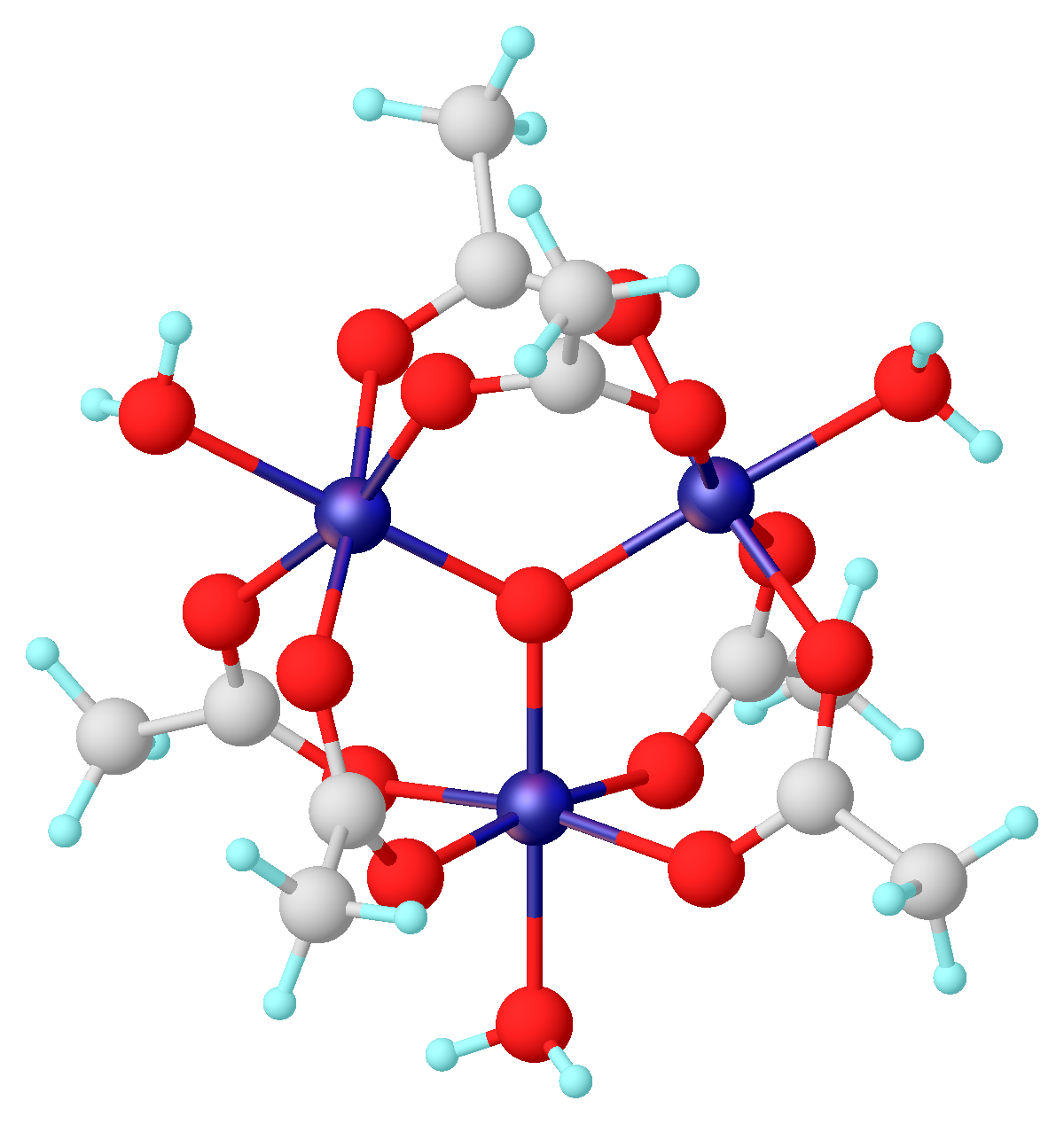

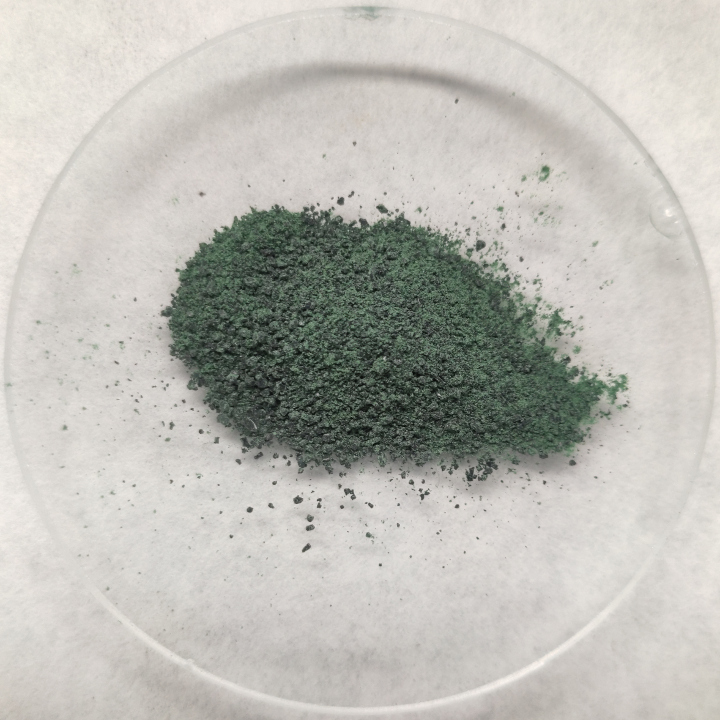

Names
- IUPAC name Chromium(III) acetate hydrate
- Other names chromic acetate, chromium triacetate, chromium(III) ethanoate

Identifiers
CAS Number	32591-52-9
3D model (JSmol)	Interactive image
ChemSpider	13394
ECHA InfoCard	100.012.646
PubChem CID	14012
CompTox Dashboard (EPA)	DTXSID4020327
- InChI: InChI=1/2C2H4O2.Cr/c2*1-2(3)4;/h2*1H3,(H,3,4);/q;;+2/p-2 Key: LRCIYVMVWAMTKX-NUQVWONBAT
- SMILES: O1C(C)=[O+][Cr-3]6(O23)([OH2+])([O+]=C(C)O4)[O+]=C(C)O[Cr-3]24([OH2+])([O+]=C(C)O5)[O+]=C(C)O[Cr-3]135([OH2+])[O+]=C(C)O6

Properties
Chemical formula	C_{12}H_{36}ClCr_{3}O_{22}
Molar mass	723.84 g·mol^{−1}
Appearance	grayish-green to blueish-green solid
Density	1.662 g/cm^{3}
Melting point	1,152 °C (2,106 °F; 1,425 K)
Magnetic susceptibility (χ)	−5104.0·10^{−6} cm^{3}/mol

Structure
Coordination geometry	octahedral

Related compounds
Related compounds	Manganese(III) acetate Iron(III) acetate
- Except where otherwise noted, data are given for materials in their standard state (at 25 °C [77 °F], 100 kPa). verify (what is ?) Infobox references

Chromium(III) acetate, commonly known as basic chromium acetate, describes a family of salts where the cation has the formula [Cr_{3}O(O_{2}CCH_{3})_{6}(OH_{2})_{3}]^{+}. The trichromium cation is encountered with a variety of anions, such as chloride and nitrate. Data in the table above are for the chloride hexahydrate, [Cr_{3}O(O_{2}CCH_{3})_{6}(OH_{2})_{3}]Cl(H_{2}O)_{6}.

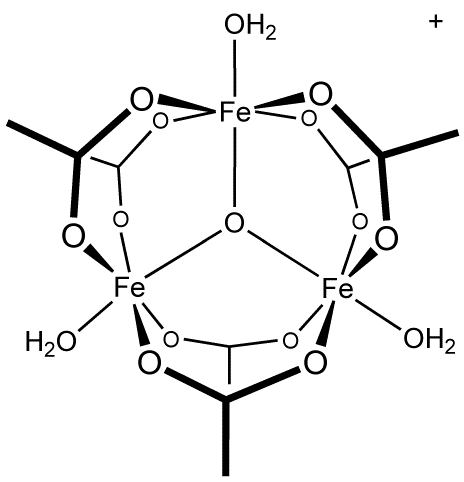
The cation in basic iron acetate is isostructural with the cation in basic chromium acetate. Both feature octahedral metal centers conjoined by oxo and acetate bridging ligands.

Salts of basic chromium acetate has long attracted interest because of its distinctive structure, which features octahedral Cr(III) centers, a triply bridging oxo ligand, six acetate ligands, and three aquo ligands. The same structure is shared with basic iron acetate and basic manganese acetate. Little evidence exists for a simple chromium(III) acetate, i.e. lacking the oxo ligand. Chromium(III) acetate is a blue/grey-green powder, which is soluble in water. It is still prepared according to the original procedure from 1909.

== See also ==
- Chromium acetate hydroxide
- Chromium(II) acetate
- Chromyl acetate, CrO_{2}(O_{2}CCH_{3})_{2}
