= Chromium(II) acetylacetonate =

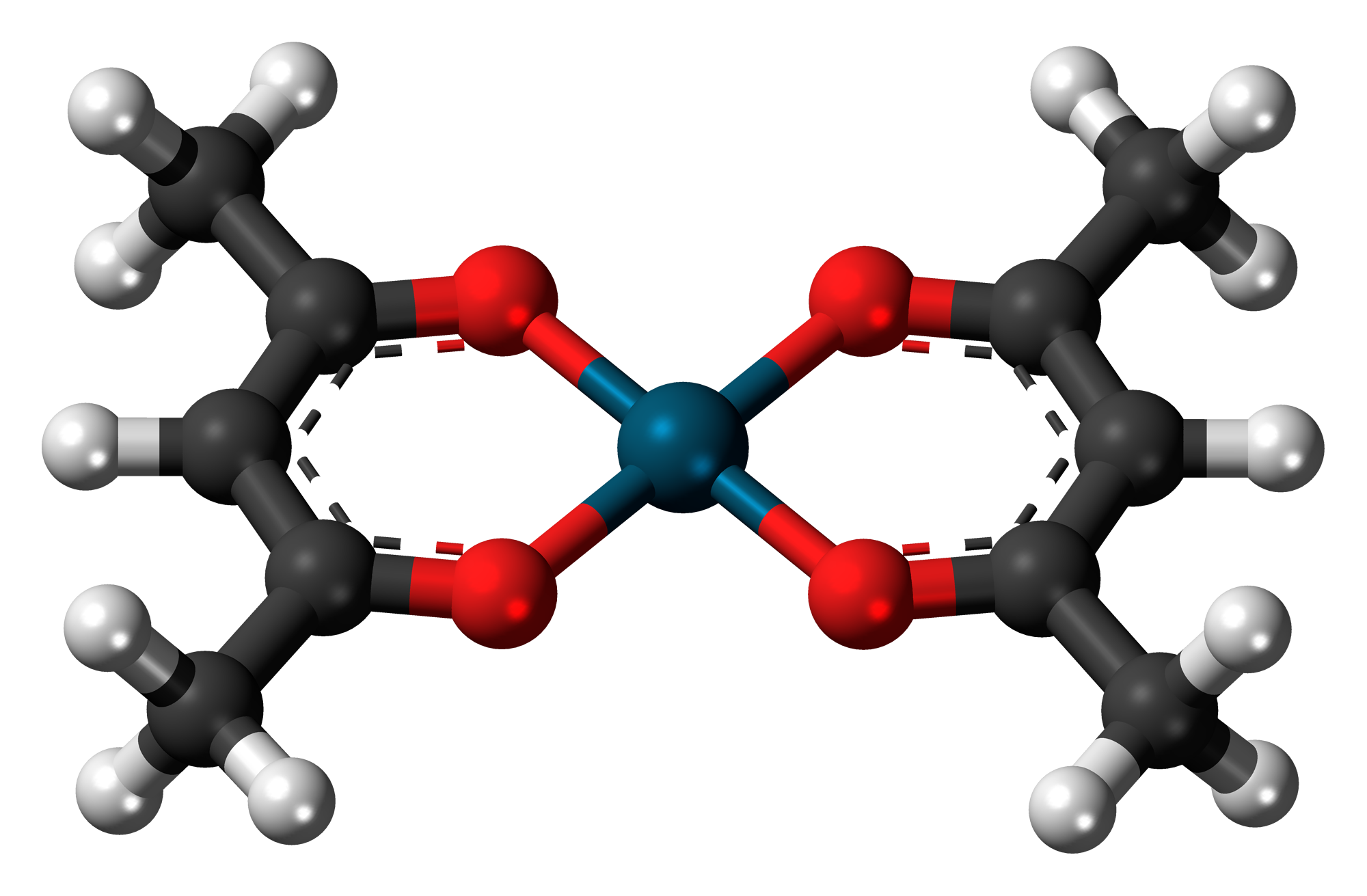

Names
- IUPAC name Bis(acetylacetonato)chromium(II)
- Systematic IUPAC name Bis[(Z)-4-oxopent-2-en-2-olato-κ^{2}O,O′]chromium(II)
- Other names chromous acetylacetonate

Identifiers
CAS Number	14024-50-1
3D model (JSmol)	Interactive image
ChEBI	CHEBI:33036
ChemSpider	4574209
ECHA InfoCard	100.034.401
EC Number	237-856-1
Gmelin Reference	487208
PubChem CID	5460744
- InChI: InChI=1S/2C5H7O2.Cr/c2*1-4(6)3-5(2)7;/h2*3H,1-2H3;/q2*-1;+2 Key: JCHSWVKCCGSOCY-UHFFFAOYSA-N
- SMILES: CC(=O)[CH-]C(=O)C.CC(=O)[CH-]C(=O)C.[Cr+2]

Properties
Chemical formula	C_{10}H_{14}CrO_{4}
Molar mass	250.214 g·mol^{−1}
Appearance	yellow-brown solid
Density	1.48 g/cm^{3}

Related compounds
Related compounds	Chromium(III) acetylacetonate
- Except where otherwise noted, data are given for materials in their standard state (at 25 °C [77 °F], 100 kPa). Infobox references

Chromium(II) acetylacetonate is the coordination compound with the formula Cr(O_{2}C_{5}H_{7})_{2}. It is the homoleptic acetylacetonate complex of chromium(II). It is an air-sensitive, paramagnetic yellow-brown solid. According to X-ray crystallography, the Cr center is square planar. In contrast to the triplet ground state for this complex, the bis(pyridine) adduct features noninnocent acac^{2-} ligand attached to Cr(III).

Chromium(II) acetylacetonate is prepared through metathesis of chromium(II) salts with acetylacetone, e.g. chromous acetate...

Cr_{2}(O_{2}CCH_{3})_{4}(H_{2}O)_{2} + 4 H_{2}C(COCH_{3})_{2} → 2 Cr(CH_{3}C(O)CHC(O)CH_{3})_{2} + 8 HO_{2}CCH_{3} + 2 H_{2}O

...or chromous chloride.
