= Chromium(II) acetate =

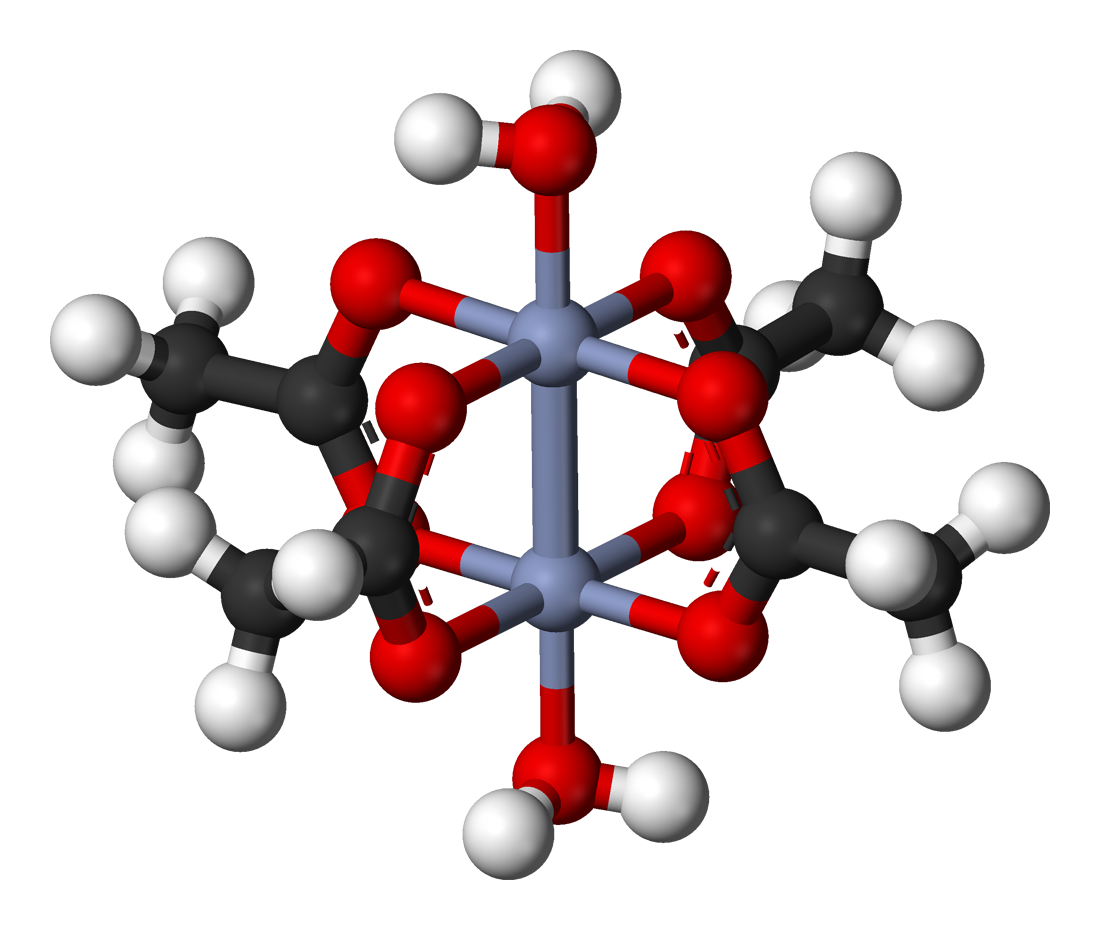

Names
- IUPAC name Chromium(II) acetate hydrate
- Other names: Chromous acetate; Chromium diacetate; Chromium(II) ethanoate

Identifiers
CAS Number	14976-80-8
3D model (JSmol)	Interactive image
ChemSpider	107397
ECHA InfoCard	100.224.848
PubChem CID	120304
RTECS number	AG3000000
UNII	H3FYF8441T
CompTox Dashboard (EPA)	DTXSID50890519
- InChI: InChI=1S/2C2H4O2.Cr/c2*1-2(3)4;/h2*1H3,(H,3,4);/q;;+2/p-2 Key: LRCIYVMVWAMTKX-UHFFFAOYSA-L; InChI=1/2C2H4O2.Cr/c2*1-2(3)4;/h2*1H3,(H,3,4);/q;;+2/p-2 Key: LRCIYVMVWAMTKX-NUQVWONBAT
- SMILES: [Cr+2]1234([OH2])#[Cr+2]([OH2])(O[C-](C)O1)(O[C-](C)O2)(O(C)[C-]O3)O(C)[C-]O4

Properties
Chemical formula	C_{8}H_{16}Cr_{2}O_{10}
Molar mass	376.198 g·mol^{−1}
Appearance	brick-red solid
Density	1.79 g/cm^{3}
Melting point	dehydrates
Solubility in water	soluble in hot water, MeOH

Structure
Crystal structure	monoclinic
Coordination geometry	octahedral counting the Cr–Cr bond
Dipole moment	0 D

Hazards
- GHS labelling
Pictograms	(GHS07: Exclamation mark)
Signal word	Warning
Hazard statements	H315, H319, H335
Precautionary statements	P261, P264, P264+P265, P271, P280, P302+P352, P304+P340, P305+P351+P338, P319, P321, P332+P317, P337+P317, P362+P364, P403+P233, P405, P501

Related compounds
Other cations	Copper(II) acetate; Molybdenum(II) acetate; Rhodium(II) acetate
Related compounds	Chromium(III) acetate; Chromium acetate hydroxide
- Except where otherwise noted, data are given for materials in their standard state (at 25 °C [77 °F], 100 kPa). verify (what is ?) Infobox references

Chromium(II) acetate hydrate, also known as chromous acetate, is the coordination compound with the formula Cr_{2}(CH_{3}CO_{2})_{4}(H_{2}O)_{2}. This formula is commonly abbreviated Cr_{2}(OAc)_{4}(H_{2}O)_{2}. This red-coloured compound features a quadruple bond. It exists as the dihydrate and the anhydrous forms. Both are diamagnetic.

Cr_{2}(OAc)_{4}(H_{2}O)_{2} is a reddish powder, although diamond-shaped tabular crystals can be grown. Consistent with the fact that it is nonionic, Cr_{2}(OAc)_{4}(H_{2}O)_{2} exhibits poor solubility in water and methanol.

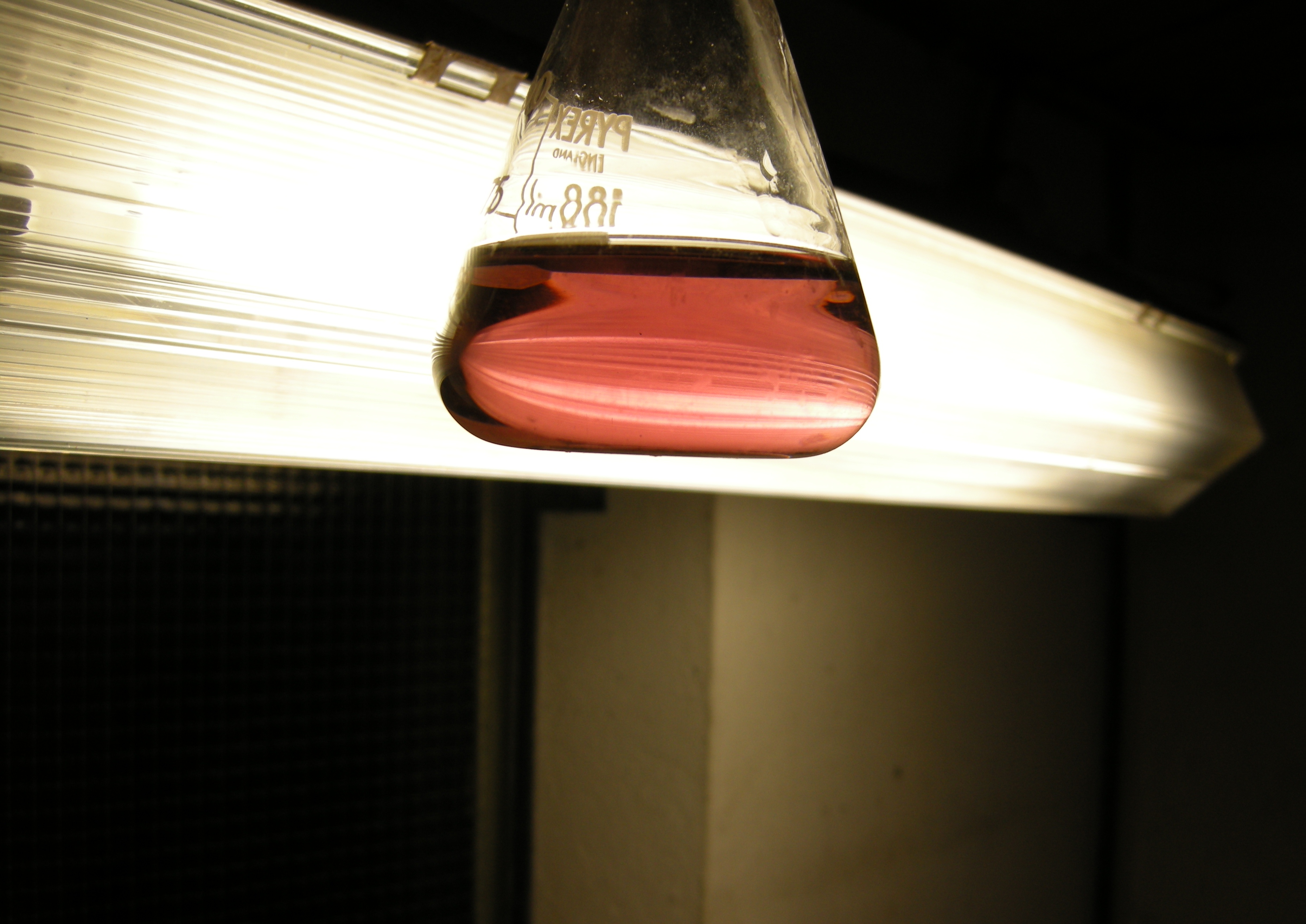
Chromium(II) acetate (aqueous solution)

== Structure ==
Subunit of the polymeric anhydrous chromous acetate

The Cr_{2}(OAc)_{4}(H_{2}O)_{2} molecule contains two atoms of chromium, two ligated molecules of water, and four acetate bridging ligands. The coordination environment around each chromium atom consists of four oxygen atoms (one from each acetate ligand) in a square, one water molecule (in an axial position), and the other chromium atom (opposite the water molecule), giving each chromium centre an octahedral geometry. The chromium atoms are joined by a quadruple bond, and the molecule has D_{4h} symmetry (ignoring the position of the hydrogen atoms). The same basic structure is adopted by Rh_{2}(OAc)_{4}(H_{2}O)_{2} and Cu_{2}(OAc)_{4}(H_{2}O)_{2}, although these species do not have such short M–M contacts.

A quadruple bond between the two chromium atoms is proposed to arise from the overlap of four d-orbitals on each metal with the same orbitals on the other metal: the d_{z^{2}} orbitals overlap to give a sigma bonding component, the d_{xz} and d_{yz} orbitals overlap to give two pi bonding components, and the d_{xy} orbitals give a delta bond. This quadruple bond is also confirmed by the low magnetic moment and short intermolecular distance between the two atoms of 236.2 ± 0.1 pm. The Cr–Cr distances are even shorter, 184 pm being the record, when the axial ligand is absent or the carboxylate is replaced with isoelectronic nitrogenous ligands.

In the anhydrous chromous acetate, the Cr-Cr distance is 2.288 Å, noticeably shorter than Cr-Cr contact in the dihydrate.

== History ==
Eugène-Melchior Péligot first reported a chromium(II) acetate in 1844. His material was apparently the dimeric Cr_{2}(OAc)_{4}(H_{2}O)_{2}. The unusual structure, as well as that of copper(II) acetate, was uncovered in 1951.

== Preparation ==
The preparation usually begins with reduction of an aqueous solution of a Cr(III) compound using zinc. The resulting blue solution is treated with sodium acetate, which results in the rapid precipitation of chromous acetate as a bright red powder.

2 Cr^{3+} + Zn → 2 Cr^{2+} + Zn^{2+}
2 Cr^{2+} + 4 OAc^{−} + 2 H_{2}O → Cr_{2}(OAc)_{4}(H_{2}O)_{2}

The synthesis of Cr_{2}(OAc)_{4}(H_{2}O)_{2} has been traditionally used to test the synthetic skills of inorganic laboratory students in universities because the accidental introduction of a small amount of air into the apparatus is readily indicated by the discoloration of the otherwise bright red product.

=== Anhydrous chromium(II) acetate ===
Heating dihydrated chromium(II) acetate at 100 °C gives the brown anhydrous compound, which is particularly sensitive to oxygen.

The anhydrous form of chromium(II) acetate, and also related chromium(II) carboxylates, can be prepared from chromocene with elimination of cyclopentadiene:

4 RCO_{2}H + 2 Cr(C_{5}H_{5})_{2} → Cr_{2}(O_{2}CR)_{4} + 4 C_{5}H_{6}

== Reactions ==
Chromium(II) acetate is a starting material for other chromium(II) compounds. For example, it reacts with acetylacetone to give chromous acetylacetonate:

Cr_{2}(O_{2}CCH_{3})_{4}(H_{2}O)_{2} + 4 H_{2}C(COCH_{3})_{2} → 2 Cr(CH_{3}C(O)CHC(O)CH_{3})_{2} + 8 HO_{2}CCH_{3} + 2 H_{2}O

Also, many analogues have been prepared using other carboxylic acids in place of acetate and using different bases in place of the water.

Chromium(II) acetate has been used to dehalogenate organic compounds such as α-bromoketones and chlorohydrins. The reactions appear to proceed via 1e^{−} steps, and rearrangement products are sometimes observed.
