= Copper(II) acetate =

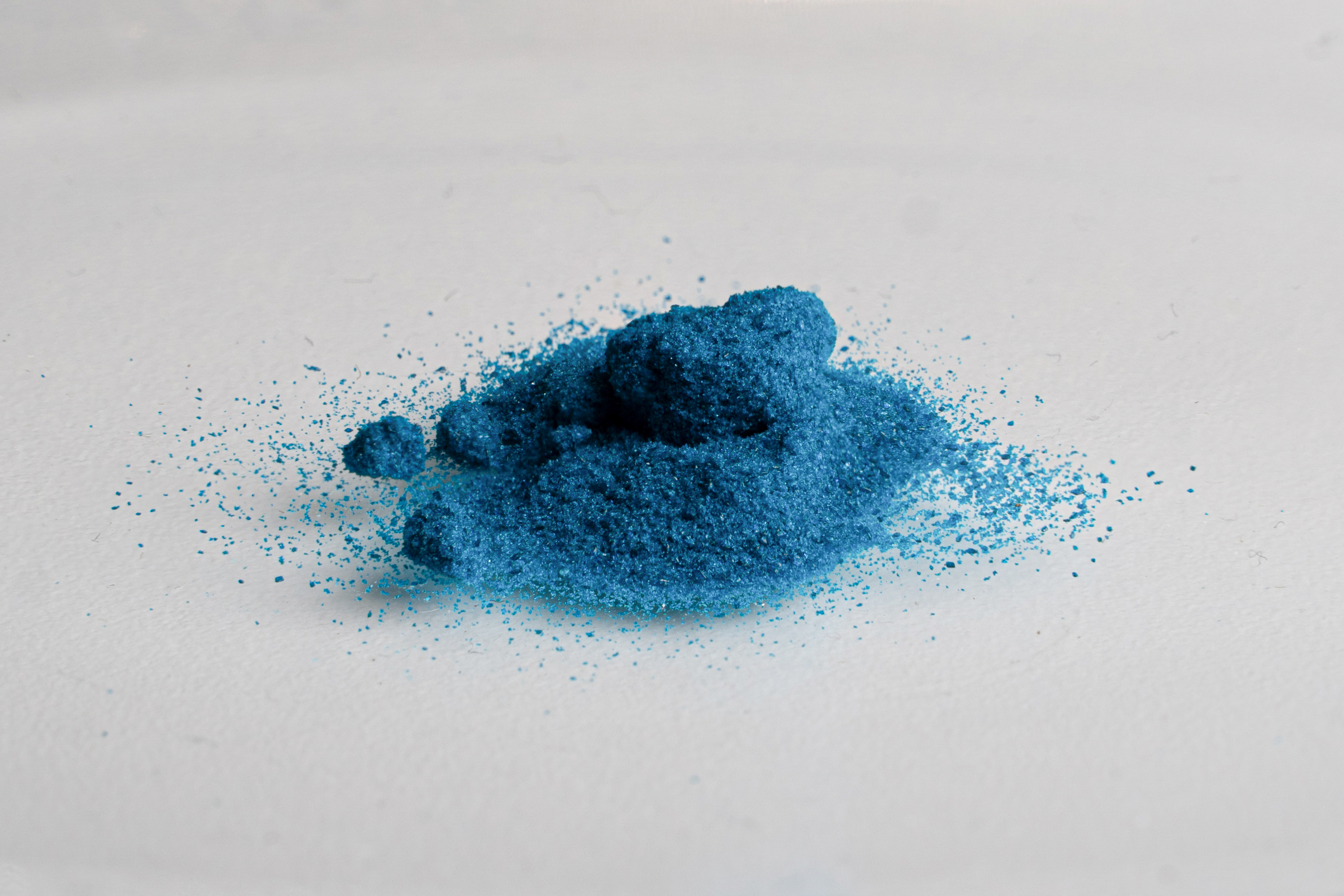
- Small crystals of anhydrous copper(II) acetate

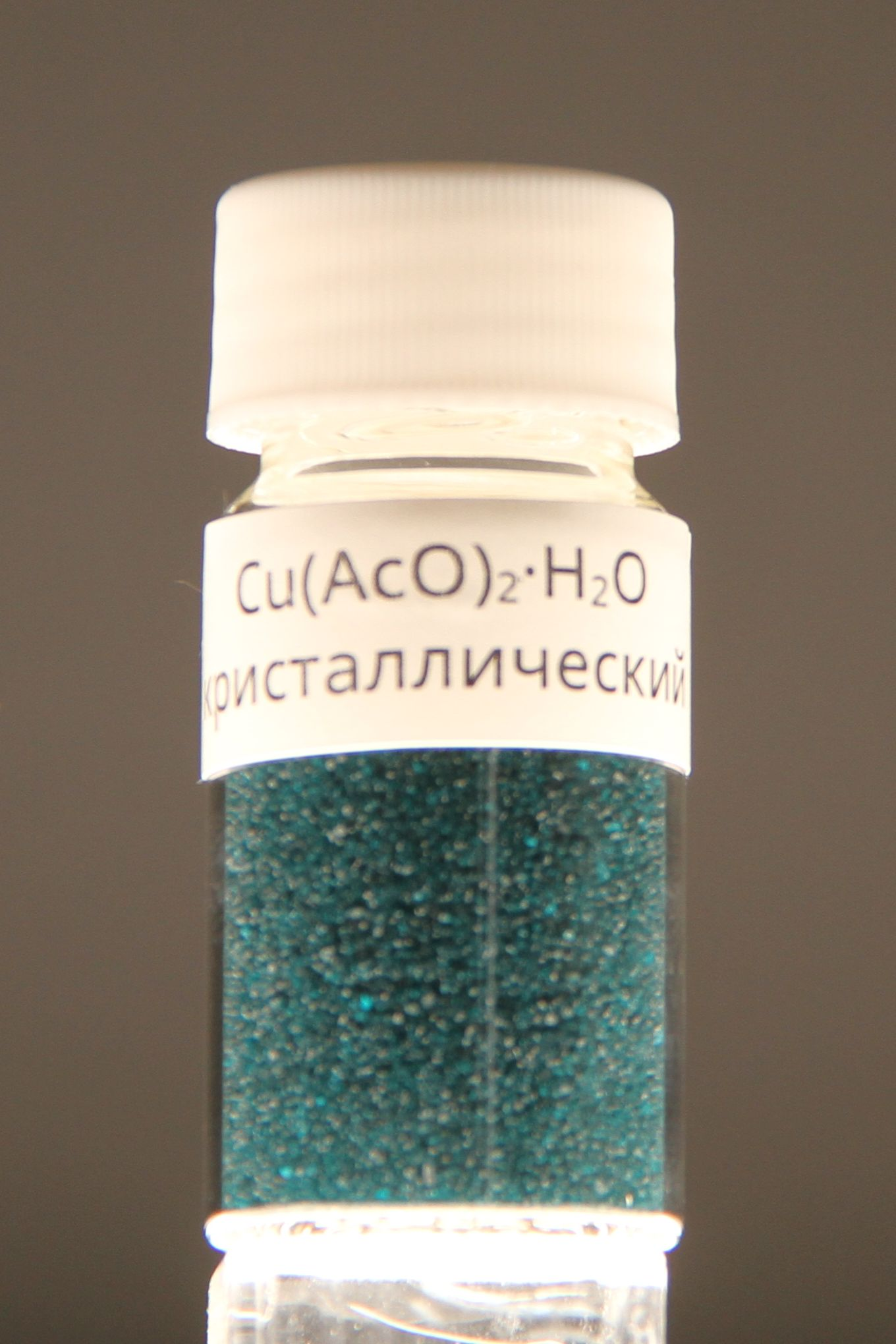
Copper(II) acetate monohydrate, crystalline
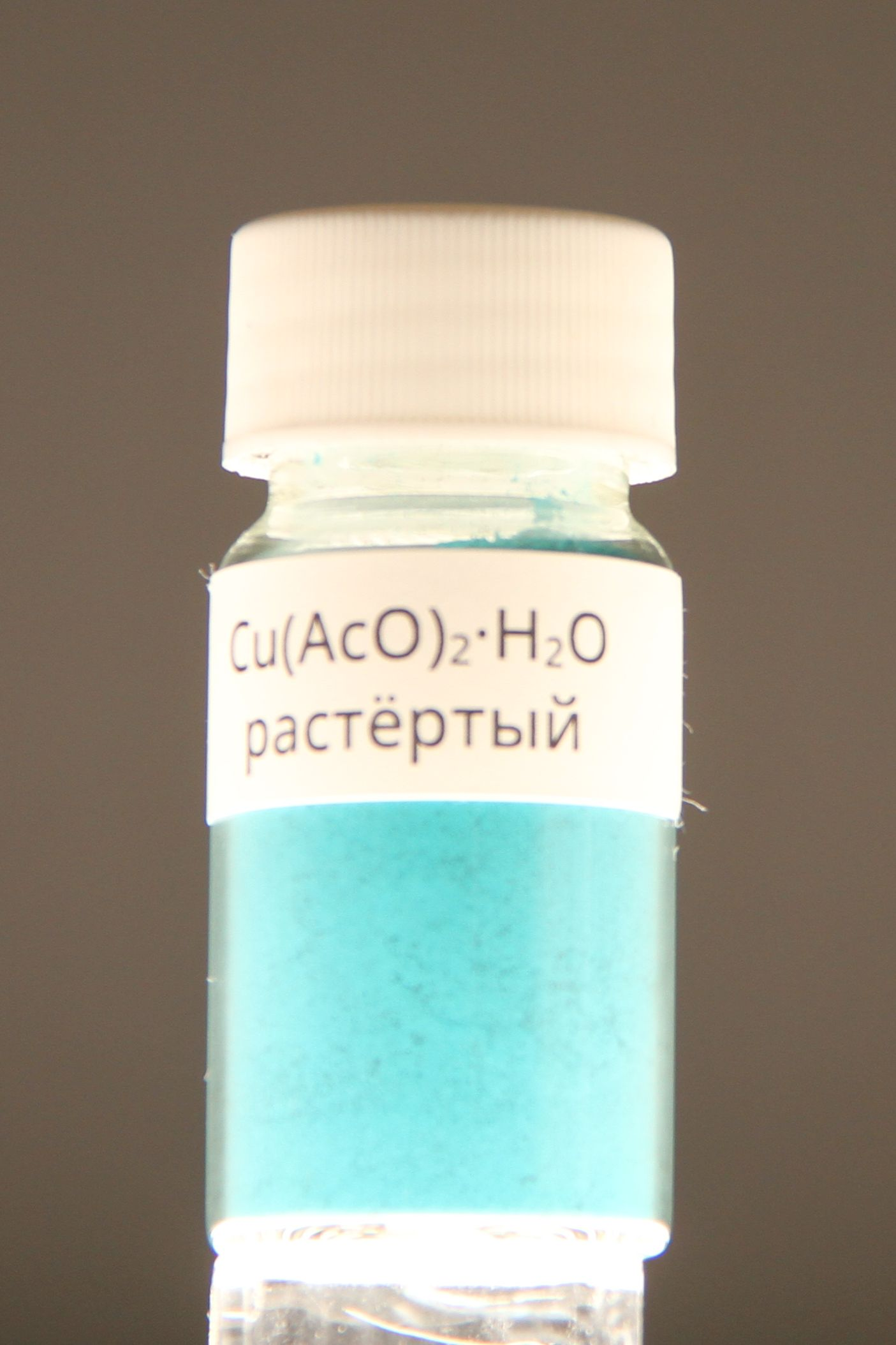
Copper(II) acetate monohydrate, milled
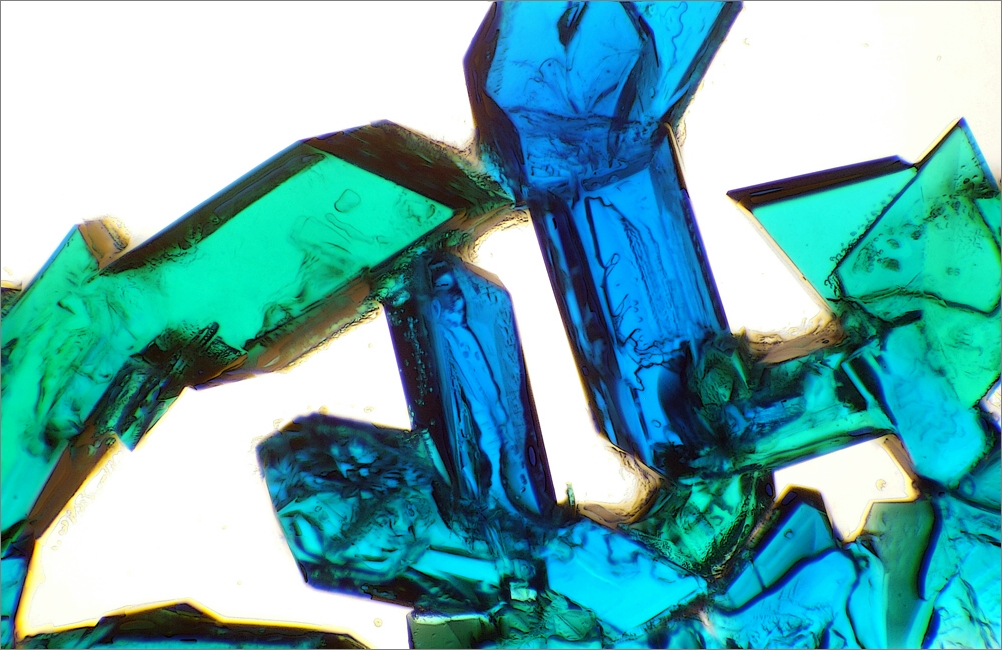

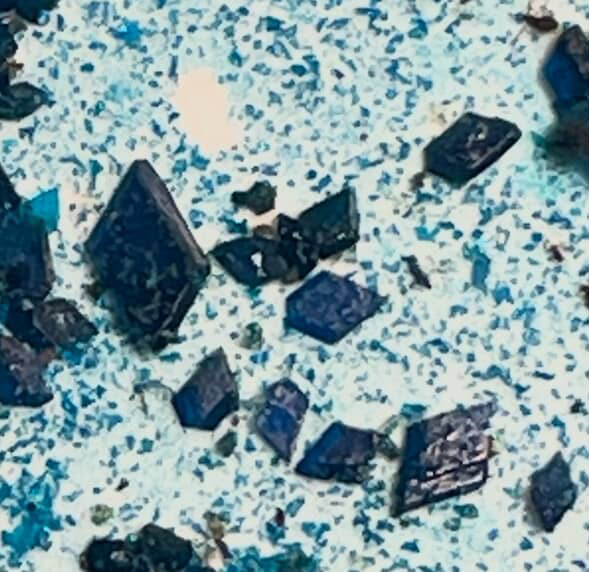
Closeup crystals of copper(II) acetate monohydrate

Names
- IUPAC name Tetra-μ^{2}-acetatodiaquadicopper(II)
- Other names Copper(II) ethanoate Cupric acetate Copper acetate Verdigris

Identifiers
CAS Number	142-71-2 (anhydrous); 6046-93-1 (hydrate)
3D model (JSmol)	Interactive image
ChemSpider	8555
ECHA InfoCard	100.005.049
EC Number	205-553-3
PubChem CID	8895
UNII	39M11XPH03 (anhydrous); 39J9V52S86 (hydrate)
UN number	3077
CompTox Dashboard (EPA)	DTXSID2059720
- InChI: InChI=1S/2C2H4O2.Cu/c2*1-2(3)4;/h2*1H3,(H,3,4);/q;;+2/p-2 Key: OPQARKPSCNTWTJ-UHFFFAOYSA-L; InChI=1/2C2H4O2.Cu/c2*1-2(3)4;/h2*1H3,(H,3,4);/q;;+2/p-2 Key: OPQARKPSCNTWTJ-NUQVWONBAO
- SMILES: [O+]1C(C)O[Cu-3]23([OH2+])[O+]C(C)O[Cu-3]1([OH2+])(OC(C)[O+]2)OC(C)[O+]3

Properties
Chemical formula	Cu(CH_{3}COO)_{2}
Molar mass	181.63 g/mol (anhydrous); 199.65 g/mol (hydrate)
Appearance	Dark green crystalline solid
Odor	Odorless (hydrate)
Density	1.882 g/cm^{3} (hydrate)
Melting point	115 °C (anhydrous) Undetermined (hydrate)
Boiling point	240 °C (464 °F; 513 K)
Solubility in water	Hydrate: 7.2 g/100 mL (cold water); 20 g/100 mL (hot water)
Solubility	Soluble in alcohol Slightly soluble in ether and glycerol
Refractive index (n_{D})	1.545 (hydrate)

Structure
Crystal structure	Monoclinic

Hazards
- GHS labelling
Pictograms	(GHS05: Corrosive) (GHS06: Toxic) (GHS07: Exclamation mark) (GHS09: Environmental hazard)
Signal word	Danger
Hazard statements	H301, H302, H311, H314, H410, H411, H412
Precautionary statements	P260, P264, P270, P273, P280, P301+P310, P301+P312, P301+P330+P331, P302+P352, P303+P361+P353, P304+P340, P305+P351+P338, P310, P312, P321, P322, P330, P361, P363, P391, P405, P501
NFPA 704 (fire diamond)	2 0 0
Flash point	Non-flammable
- Lethal dose or concentration (LD, LC)
LD_{50} (median dose)	710 mg/kg oral rat
- NIOSH (US health exposure limits)
PEL (Permissible)	TWA 1 mg/m^{3} (as Cu)
REL (Recommended)	TWA 1 mg/m^{3} (as Cu)
IDLH (Immediate danger)	TWA 100 mg/m^{3} (as Cu)
Safety data sheet (SDS)	Baker MSDS
- Except where otherwise noted, data are given for materials in their standard state (at 25 °C [77 °F], 100 kPa). verify (what is ?) Infobox references

Copper(II) acetate, also referred to as cupric acetate, is the chemical compound with the formula Cu(OAc)_{2} where AcO^{−} is acetate (CH_{3}CO^{−}_{2}). The hydrated derivative, Cu_{2}(OAc)_{4}(H_{2}O)_{2}, which contains one molecule of water for each copper atom, is available commercially. Anhydrous copper(II) acetate is a dark green crystalline solid, whereas Cu_{2}(OAc)_{4}(H_{2}O)_{2} is more bluish-green. Since ancient times, copper acetates of some form have been used as fungicides and green pigments. Today, copper acetates are used as reagents for the synthesis of various inorganic and organic compounds. Copper acetate, like all copper compounds, emits a blue-green glow in a flame.

== Occurrence ==
The mineral hoganite is a naturally occurring form of copper(II) acetate. A related mineral, also containing calcium, is paceite. Both are very rare.

== Structure ==
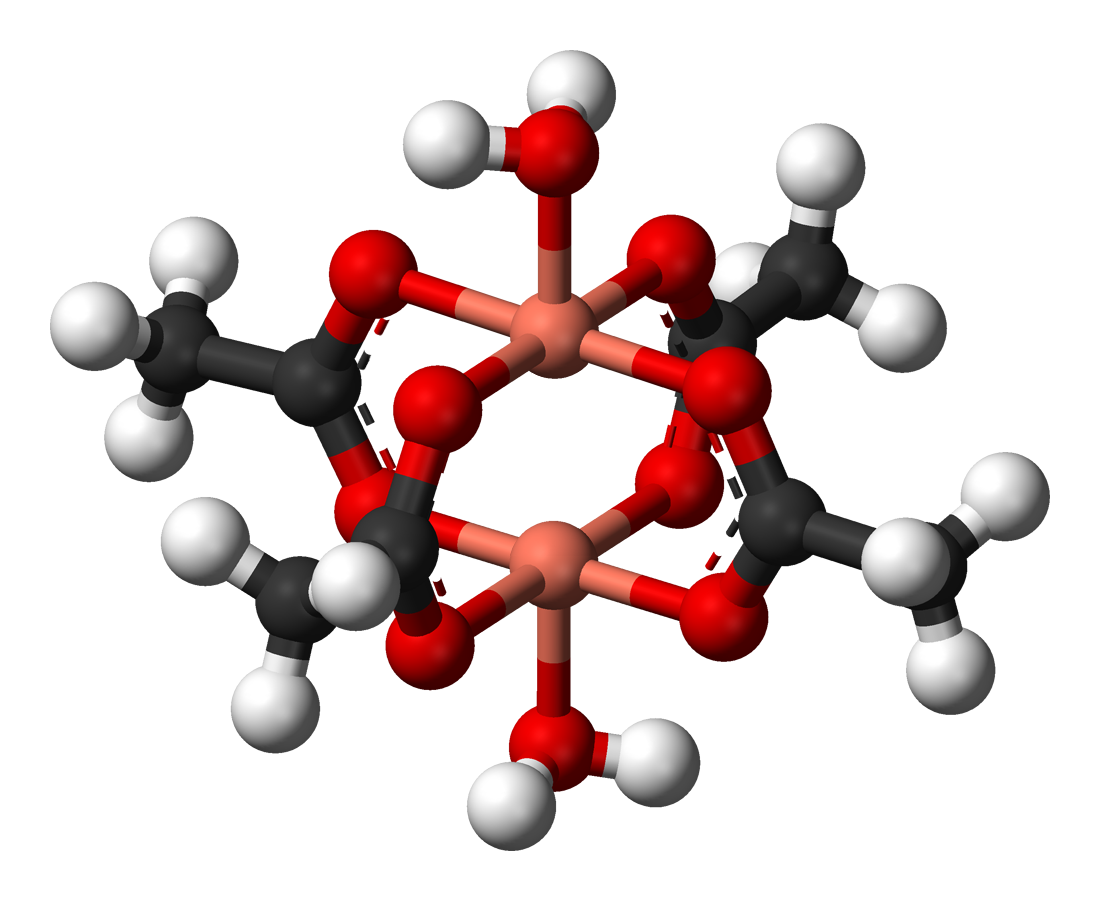
Copper(II) acetate structure

Copper acetate hydrate adopts the paddle wheel structure seen also for related Rh(II) and Cr(II) tetraacetates. One oxygen atom on each acetate is bound to one copper atom at 1.97 Å (0.197 nm). Completing the coordination sphere are two water ligands, with Cu-O distances of 2.20 Å (0.220 nm). The two copper atoms are separated by only 2.62 Å (0.262 nm), which is close to the Cu-Cu separation in metallic copper. The two copper centers interact resulting in a diminishing of the magnetic moment such that at temperatures below 90 K (−297.7 °F), Cu_{2}(OAc)_{4}(H_{2}O)_{2} is essentially diamagnetic. Cu_{2}(OAc)_{4}(H_{2}O)_{2} was a critical step in the development of modern theories for antiferromagnetic exchange coupling, which ascribe its low-temperature diamagnetic behavior to cancellation of the two opposing spins on the adjacent copper atoms.

== Synthesis ==
Copper(II) acetate is prepared industrially by heating copper(II) hydroxide or basic copper(II) carbonate with acetic acid.

== Uses ==
=== Organic synthesis ===
Copper(II) acetate has found some use as an oxidizing agent in organic syntheses. In the Eglinton reaction Cu_{2}(OAc)_{4} is used to couple terminal alkynes to give a 1,3-diyne:

Cu_{2}(OAc)_{4} + 2 RC≡CH → 2 CuOAc + RC≡C−C≡CR + 2 HOAc

The reaction proceeds via the intermediacy of copper(I) acetylides, which are then oxidized by the copper(II) acetate, releasing the acetylide radical. A related reaction involving copper acetylides is the synthesis of ynamines, terminal alkynes with amine groups using Cu_{2}(OAc)_{4}. It has been used for hydroamination of acrylonitrile.

=== Chemical analysis ===
In chemical analysis, it serves as an oxidizing agent in both the Barfoed's test for presence of monosaccharides and as a precursor to a copper-fatty acid complex in the colorimetric copper soap assay to test for free fatty acids.

=== Other ===
A mixture of copper acetate and ammonium chloride is used to chemically color copper with a bronze patina.

== Related compounds ==
=== Copper(I) acetate ===
Heating a mixture of anhydrous copper(II) acetate and copper metal affords copper(I) acetate:

Cu + Cu(OAc)_{2} → 2 CuOAc

Unlike the copper(II) derivative, copper(I) acetate is colourless and diamagnetic.

=== Basic copper acetate ===
"Basic copper acetate" is prepared by neutralizing an aqueous solution of copper(II) acetate. The basic acetate is poorly soluble. This material is a component of verdigris, the blue-green substance that forms on copper during long exposures to atmosphere.

=== Copper acetoarsenite ===
Copper(II) acetate reacts with arsenic trioxide to form copper acetoarsenite, a powerful insecticide and fungicide called Paris green.
