= Acetate =

Salt formed from acetic acid and a base

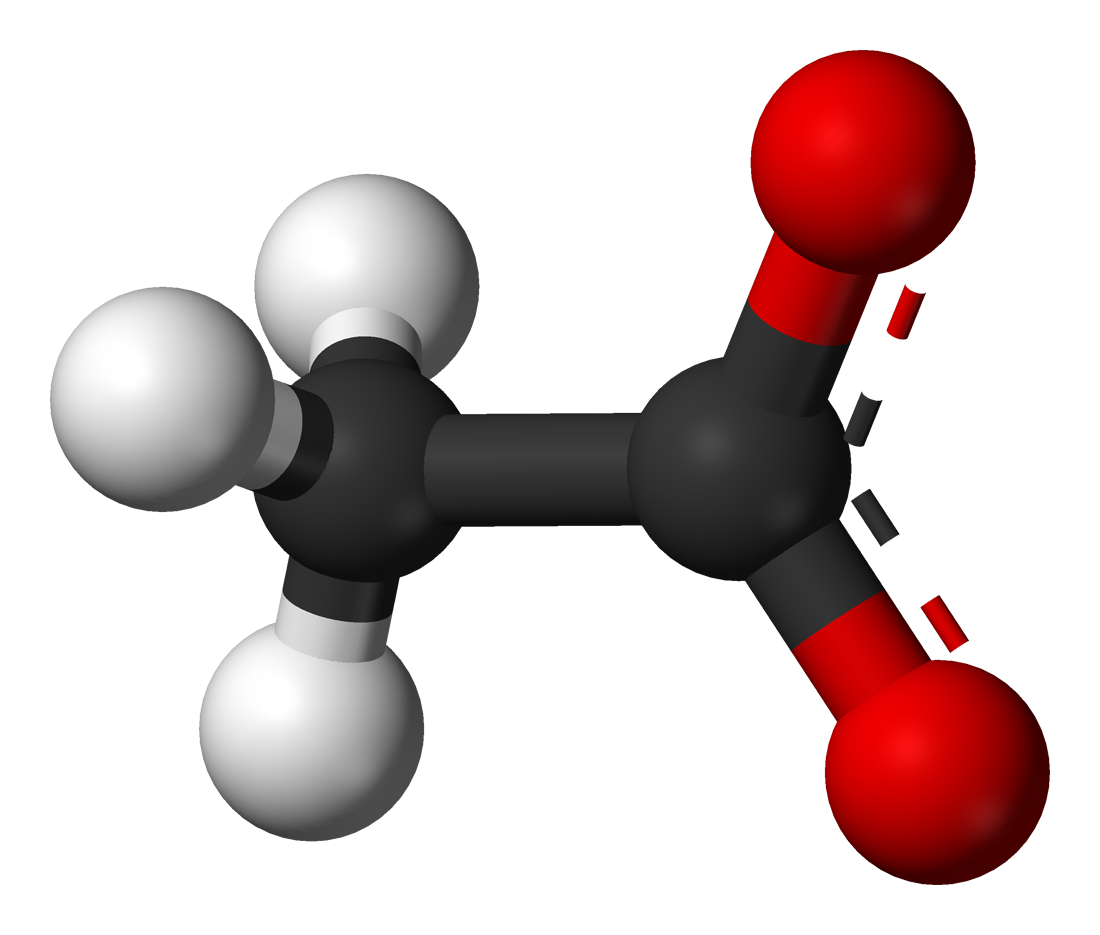

Names
- IUPAC name Acetate
- Systematic IUPAC name Ethanoate

Identifiers
CAS Number	71-50-1
3D model (JSmol)	Interactive image
ChEBI	CHEBI:30089
ChemSpider	170
DrugBank	DB14511
PubChem CID	175
UNII	569DQM74SC
- InChI: InChI=1S/C2H4O2/c1-2(3)4/h1H3,(H,3,4)/p-1 Key: QTBSBXVTEAMEQO-UHFFFAOYSA-M; InChI=1/C2H4O2/c1-2(3)4/h1H3,(H,3,4)/p-1 Key: QTBSBXVTEAMEQO-REWHXWOFAL
- SMILES: CC(=O)[O-]

Properties
Chemical formula	C_{2}H_{3}O_{2}^{−}
Molar mass	59.045 g·mol^{−1}
Conjugate acid	Acetic acid
- Except where otherwise noted, data are given for materials in their standard state (at 25 °C [77 °F], 100 kPa). Infobox references

An acetate is a salt formed by the combination of acetic acid with a base (e.g. alkaline, earthy, metallic, nonmetallic, or radical base). "Acetate" also describes the conjugate base or ion (specifically, the negatively charged ion called an anion) typically found in aqueous solution and written with the chemical formula C_{2}H_{3}O^{−}_{2}. The neutral molecules formed by the combination of the acetate ion and a positive ion (called a cation) are also commonly called "acetates" (hence, acetate of lead, acetate of aluminium, etc.). The simplest of these is hydrogen acetate (called acetic acid) with corresponding salts, esters, and the polyatomic anion CH_{3}CO^{−}_{2}, or CH_{3}COO^{−}.

Most of the approximately 5 million tonnes of acetic acid produced annually in industry are used in the production of acetates, which usually take the form of polymers. In nature, acetate is the most common building block for biosynthesis.

== Nomenclature and common formula ==
When part of a salt, the formula of the acetate ion is written as CH_{3}CO^{−}_{2}, C_{2}H_{3}O^{−}_{2}, or CH_{3}COO^{−}. Chemists often represent acetate as OAc^{−} or, less commonly, AcO^{−}. Thus, HOAc is the symbol for acetic acid, NaOAc for sodium acetate, and EtOAc for ethyl acetate (as Ac is common symbol for acetyl group CH_{3}CO). The pseudoelement symbol "Ac" is also sometimes encountered in chemical formulas as indicating the entire acetate ion (CH_{3}CO^{−}_{2}). It is not to be confused with the symbol of actinium, the first element of the actinide series; context guides disambiguation. For example, the formula for sodium acetate might be abbreviated as "NaOAc", rather than "NaC_{2}H_{3}O_{2}". Care should also be taken to avoid confusion with peracetic acid when using the OAc abbreviation; for clarity and to avoid errors when translated, HOAc should be avoided in literature mentioning both compounds.

Although its systematic name is ethanoate (/ɪˈθænoʊ.eɪt/), the common acetate remains the preferred IUPAC name.

== Salts ==
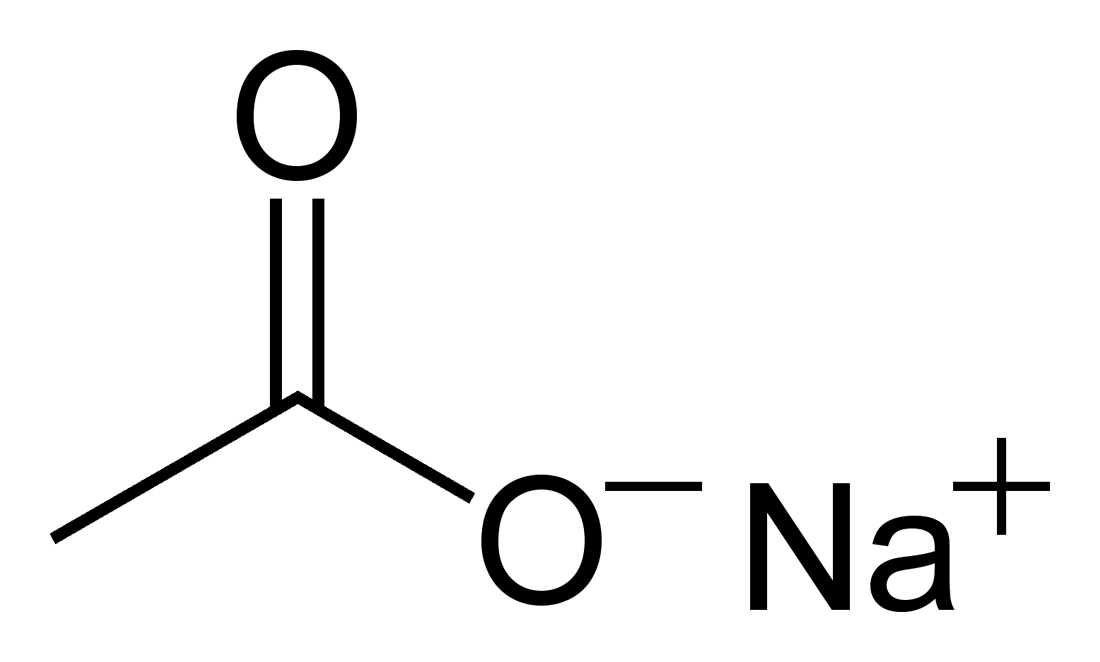
Sodium acetate salt

The acetate anion, [CH_{3}COO]^{−},(or [C_{2}H_{3}O_{2}]^{−}) is one of the carboxylate family. It is the conjugate base of acetic acid. Above a pH of 5.5, acetic acid converts to acetate:

CH_{3}COOH ⇌ CH_{3}COO^{−} + H^{+}

Many acetate salts are ionic, indicated by their tendency to dissolve well in water. A commonly encountered acetate in the home is sodium acetate, a white solid that can be prepared by combining vinegar and sodium bicarbonate ("bicarbonate of soda"):

CH_{3}COOH + NaHCO_{3} → CH_{3}COO^{−}Na^{+} + H_{2}O + CO_{2}

Transition metals can be complexed by acetate. Examples of acetate complexes include chromium(II) acetate and many other transition metal carboxylate complexes.

Commercially important acetate salts are aluminium acetate, used in dyeing, ammonium acetate, a precursor to acetamide, and potassium acetate, used as a diuretic. All three salts are colourless and highly soluble in water.

== Esters ==
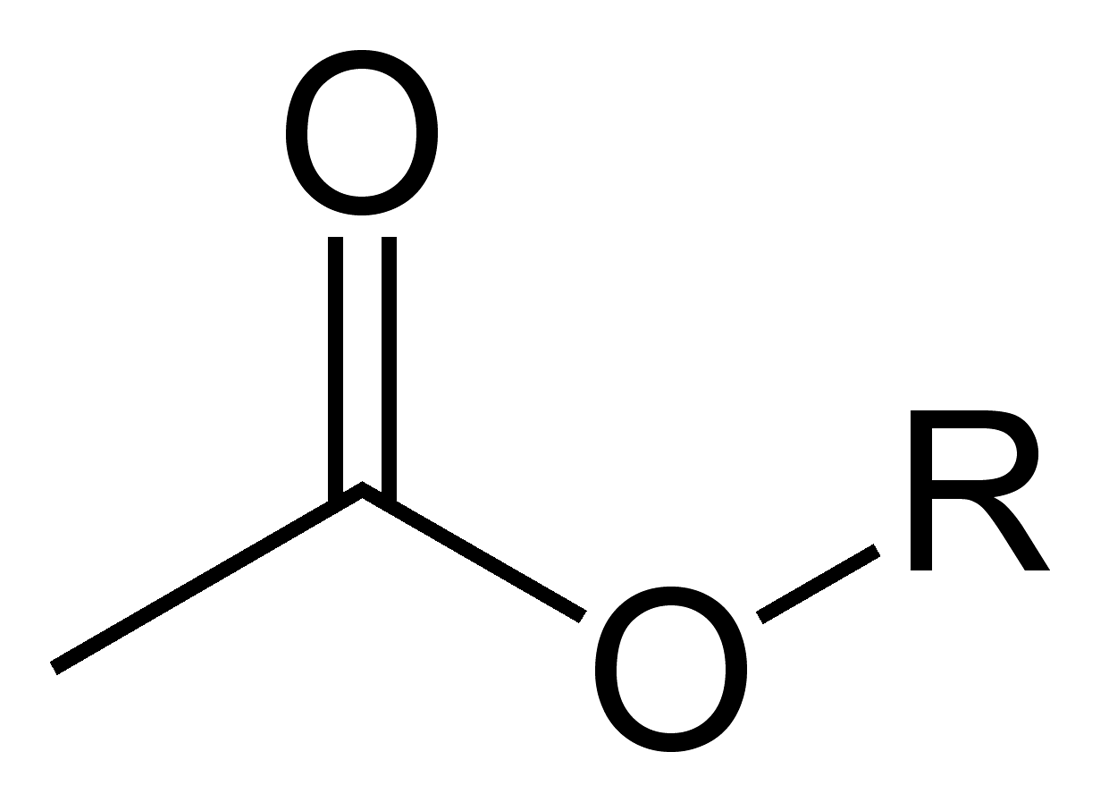
acetate ester

Acetate esters have the general formula CH_{3}CO_{2}R, where R is an organyl group. The esters are the dominant forms of acetate in the marketplace. Unlike the acetate salts, acetate esters are often liquids, lipophilic, and sometimes volatile. They are popular because they have inoffensive, often sweet odors, they are inexpensive, and they are usually of low toxicity.

Almost half of acetic acid production is consumed in the production of vinyl acetate, precursor to polyvinyl alcohol, which is a component of many paints. The second largest use of acetic acid is consumed in the production of cellulose acetate. In fact, "acetate" is jargon for cellulose acetate, which is used in the production of fibres or diverse products, e.g. the acetate discs used in audio record production. Cellulose acetate can be found in many household products. Many industrial solvents are acetates, including methyl acetate, ethyl acetate, isopropyl acetate, and ethylhexyl acetate. Butyl acetate is a fragrance used in food products.

== Acetate in biology ==
Acetate is a common anion in biology. It is mainly utilized by organisms in the form of acetyl coenzyme A.

Intraperitoneal injection of sodium acetate (20 or 60 mg per kg body mass) was found to induce headache in sensitized rats, and it has been proposed that acetate resulting from oxidation of ethanol is a major factor in causing hangovers. Increased serum acetate levels lead to accumulation of adenosine in many tissues including the brain, and administration of the adenosine receptor antagonist caffeine to rats after ethanol was found to decrease nociceptive behavior.

Acetate has known immunomodulatory properties and can affect the innate immune response to pathogenic bacteria such as the respiratory pathogen Haemophilus influenzae.

== Fermentation of acetyl CoA to acetate ==
Pyruvate is converted into acetyl-coenzyme A (acetyl-CoA) by the enzyme pyruvate dehydrogenase. This acetyl-CoA is then converted into acetate in E. coli, whilst producing ATP by substrate-level phosphorylation. Acetate formation requires two enzymes: phosphate acetyltransferase and acetate kinase.

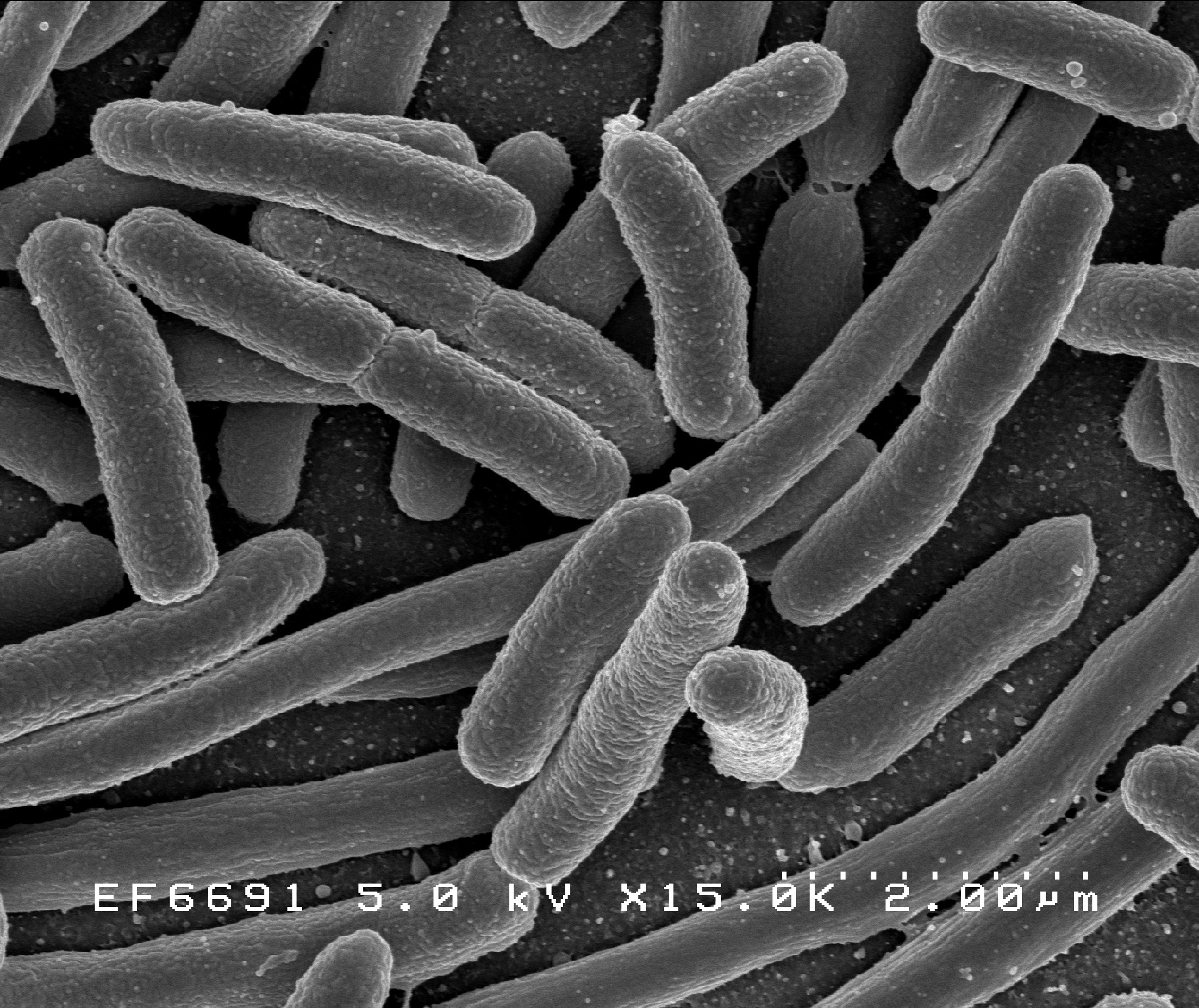
The mixed acid fermentation pathway is characteristic of the family Enterobacteriaceae, which includes E. coli

acetyl-CoA + phosphate → acetyl-phosphate + CoA

acetyl-phosphate + ADP → acetate + ATP

== Fermentation of acetate ==
Acetic acid can also undergo a dismutation reaction to produce methane and carbon dioxide:

CH_{3}COO^{−} + H^{+} → CH_{4} + CO_{2} ΔG° = −36 kJ/mol

This disproportionation reaction is catalysed by methanogen archaea in their fermentative metabolism. One electron is transferred from the carbonyl function (e^{−} donor) of the carboxylic group to the methyl group (e^{−} acceptor) of acetic acid to respectively produce CO_{2} and methane gas.

== Structures ==
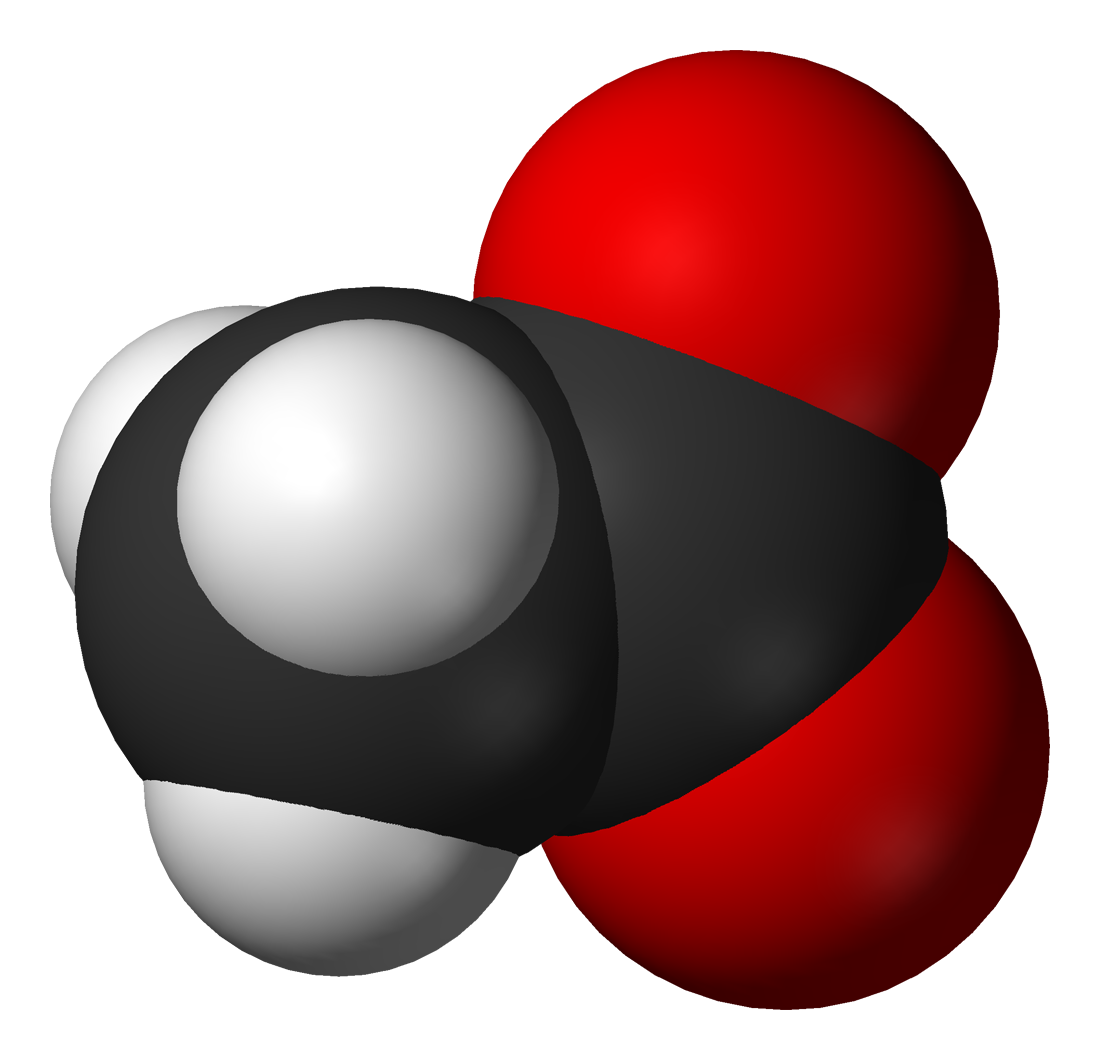
Space-filling model of the acetate anion

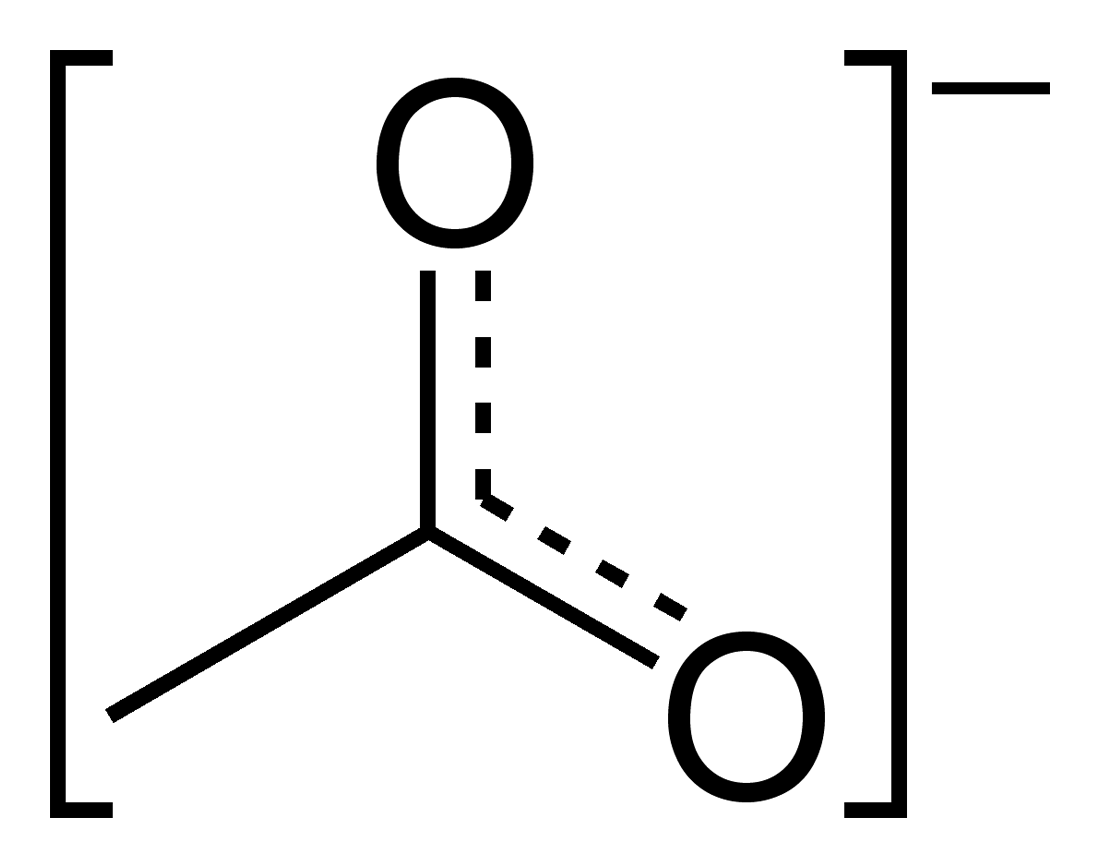
resonance hybrid of the acetate anion

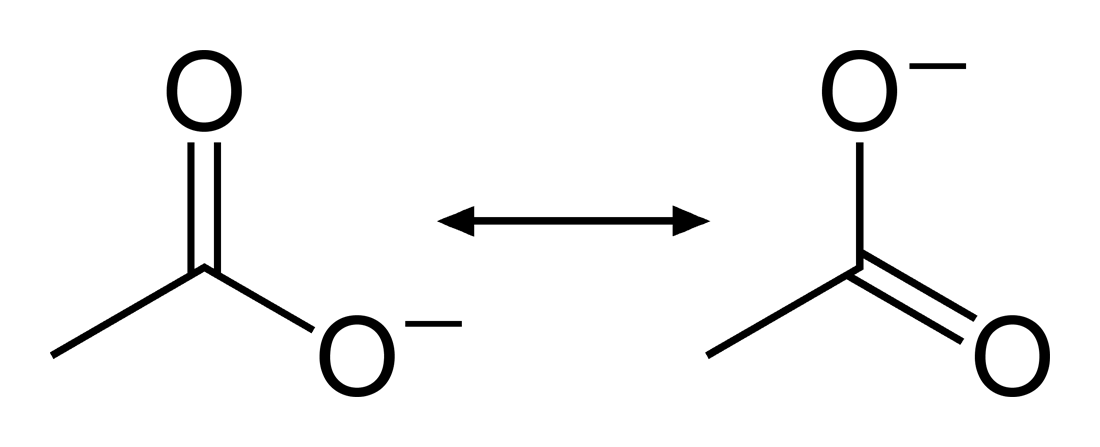
canonical forms of the acetate anion

== See also ==
- Acetic acid
- Acetoxy group
- Acetyl chloride
- Acetylation
- Cellulose acetate
- Copper(II) acetate
- Fermentation (biochemistry)
- Mixed acid fermentation
- Sodium acetate
- Zinc acetate
