= Surface-barrier transistor =

Type of transistor developed by Philco in 1953

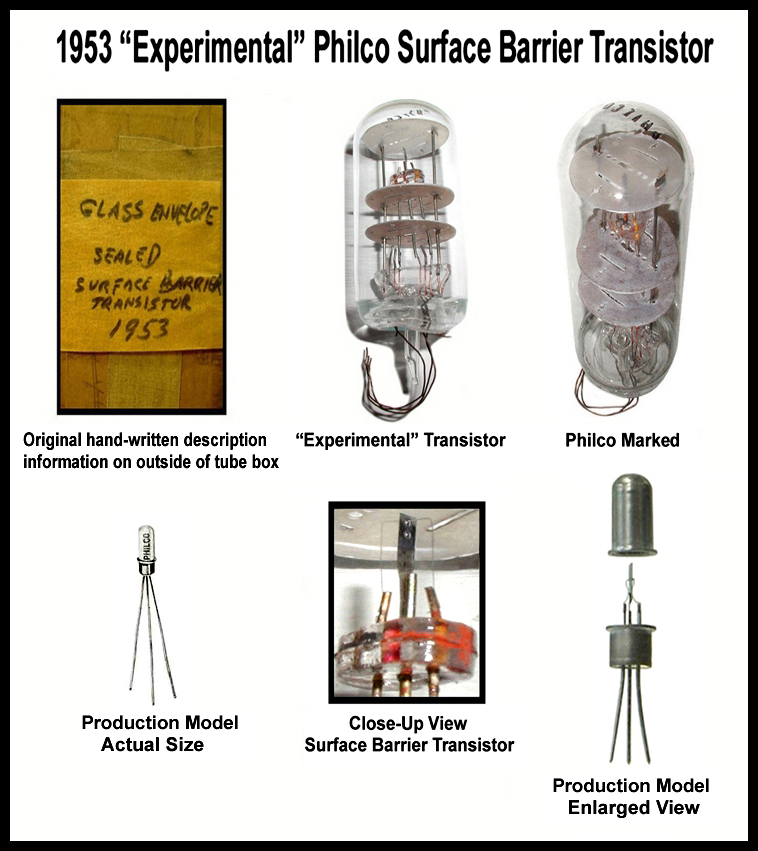
Philco Surface Barrier transistor developed and produced in 1953

The surface-barrier transistor is a type of transistor developed by Philco in 1953 as an improvement to the alloy-junction transistor and the earlier point-contact transistor. Like the modern Schottky transistor, it offered much higher speed than earlier transistors and used metal–semiconductor junctions (instead of semiconductor–semiconductor junctions), but unlike the Schottky transistor, both junctions were metal–semiconductor junctions.

== Production process ==
Philco used a patented process of applying two tiny electrochemical jet streams of liquid indium sulfate (electrolyte solution) on opposite sides of a thin strip of N-type germanium base material. This process would etch away and form circular well depressions on each side of the N-type germanium base material, until the germanium base material was ultra thin and having a thickness of approximately a few ten-thousandths of an inch. After the etching process was finished, the polarity applied to the electrolyte was reversed, resulting in metallic indium being electroplated into these etched circular well depressions, forming the transistor's emitter and collector electrodes. The Philco surface-barrier transistor was the world's first high-frequency junction transistor, which was capable of obtaining frequencies up to 60 MHz. It was developed and produced at the Lansdale Tube Company-division of Philco Corporation. Philco Corporation had produced a late 1950s production film about its surface-barrier transistor manufacturing processes and product developments that was titled, "Philco Transistors – The Tiny Giants Of The Future".

== Transistor radios ==
1955 Chrysler - Philco all transistor car radio - "Breaking News" radio broadcast announcement.

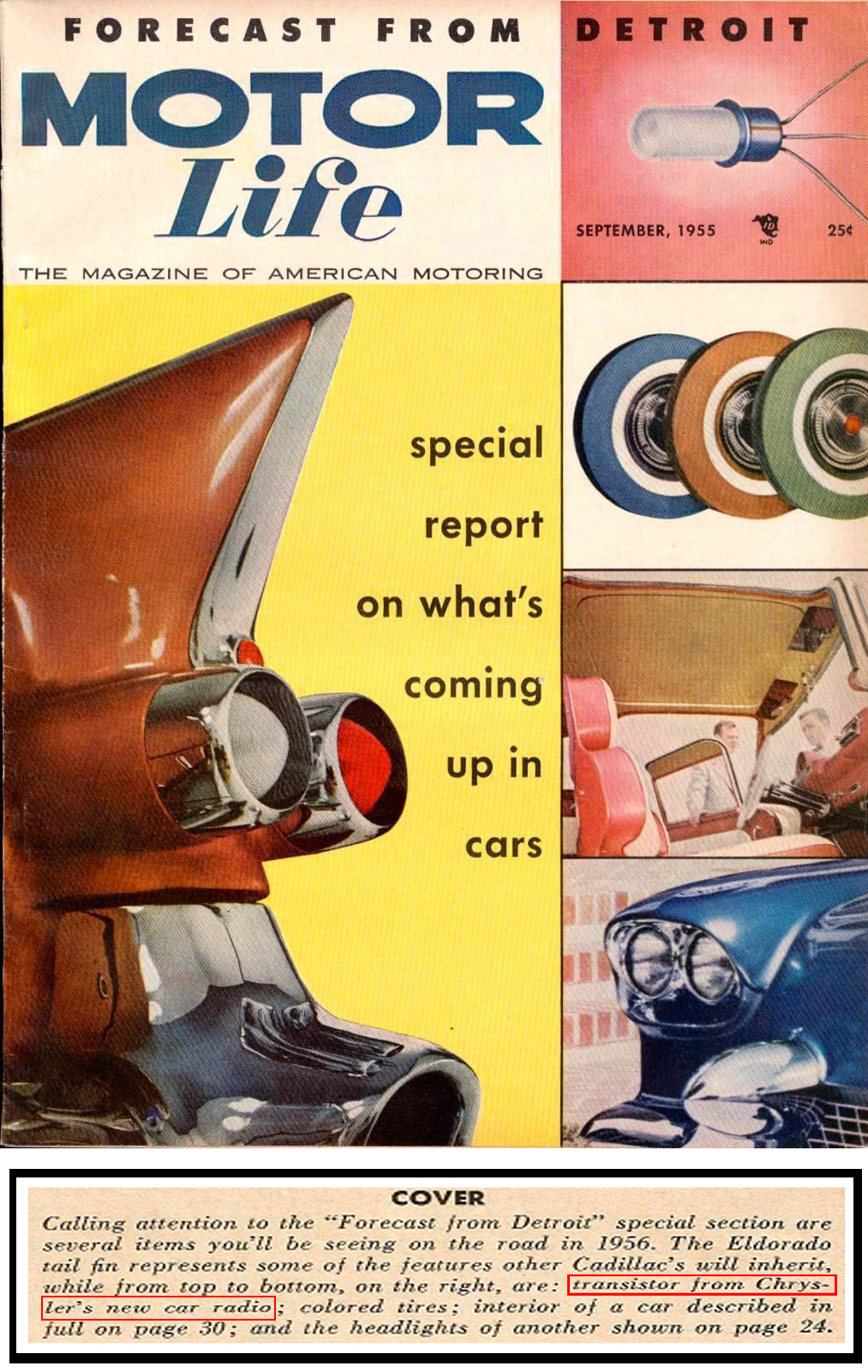
Philco's Surface-Barrier transistor shown on Motor Life (Sept 1955) magazine cover, which was also used in Chrysler's all-transistor car radio.

The Mopar model 914HR, the world's first all-transistor car radio, was developed and produced by Chrysler and Philco in 1955. Chrysler offered this radio as an option in the fall of 1955 for its new line of Chrysler and Imperial cars. Philco was the manufacturer of these all-transistor car radios for the Chrysler Corporation, and had also used its surface-barrier transistors in the radio's circuit design.

== Commercial manufacturing license agreements ==
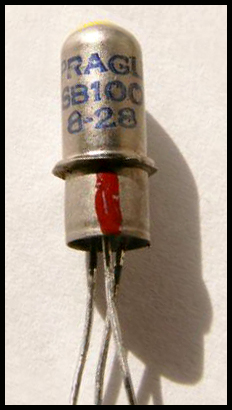
Sprague surface-barrier (SB100) transistor licensed by Philco Corporation

Starting in 1955, Philco had decided to sell commercial manufacturing license agreements with other large electronic semiconductor companies, which allowed them the right to produce and sell its high-frequency surface-barrier transistors. Sprague Electric Company was one of the first companies to purchase a license agreement from Philco in late 1955 and started to manufacture the surface-barrier transistors under its Sprague name, in early 1956. Another company to purchase a license agreement from Philco in early 1957 was Semiconductors Limited, a division of the British-based Plessey Company. In 1959, General Transistor Corporation had also purchased a license agreement from Philco, to manufacture its complete line of high-speed transistors.

== Military satellites ==
In 1956, Philco had developed an "improved" higher-speed version of its original surface-barrier transistor, which was used in military applications and was called the surface-barrier diffused-base transistor (SBDT). Philco had used surface diffusion of a gaseous form of phosphorus atom particles, to penetrate the surface of the intrinsic semiconductor base material. The Philco SBDT transistor was capable of operating in the UHF range. Philco's SBDT improved surface-barrier transistor was used in the early prototype design of the 10-milliwatt Minitrack satellite transistorized (radio beacon) transmitter, for the United States Navy Vanguard I satellite project program.

On January 31, 1958, the United States' first artificial Earth satellite was launched by the Army Ballistic Missile Agency at Cape Canaveral in Florida, which was called Explorer 1, and was developed by the California Institute of Technology Jet Propulsion Laboratory (JPL). The Explorer 1 satellite's payload consisted of a low-power Microlock transistorized (radio beacon) 108.00 MHz transmitter, which was used for tracking and telemetry, and had consisted of a Philco high-frequency surface-barrier transistor in its original circuitry designs.

== Transistorized computers ==
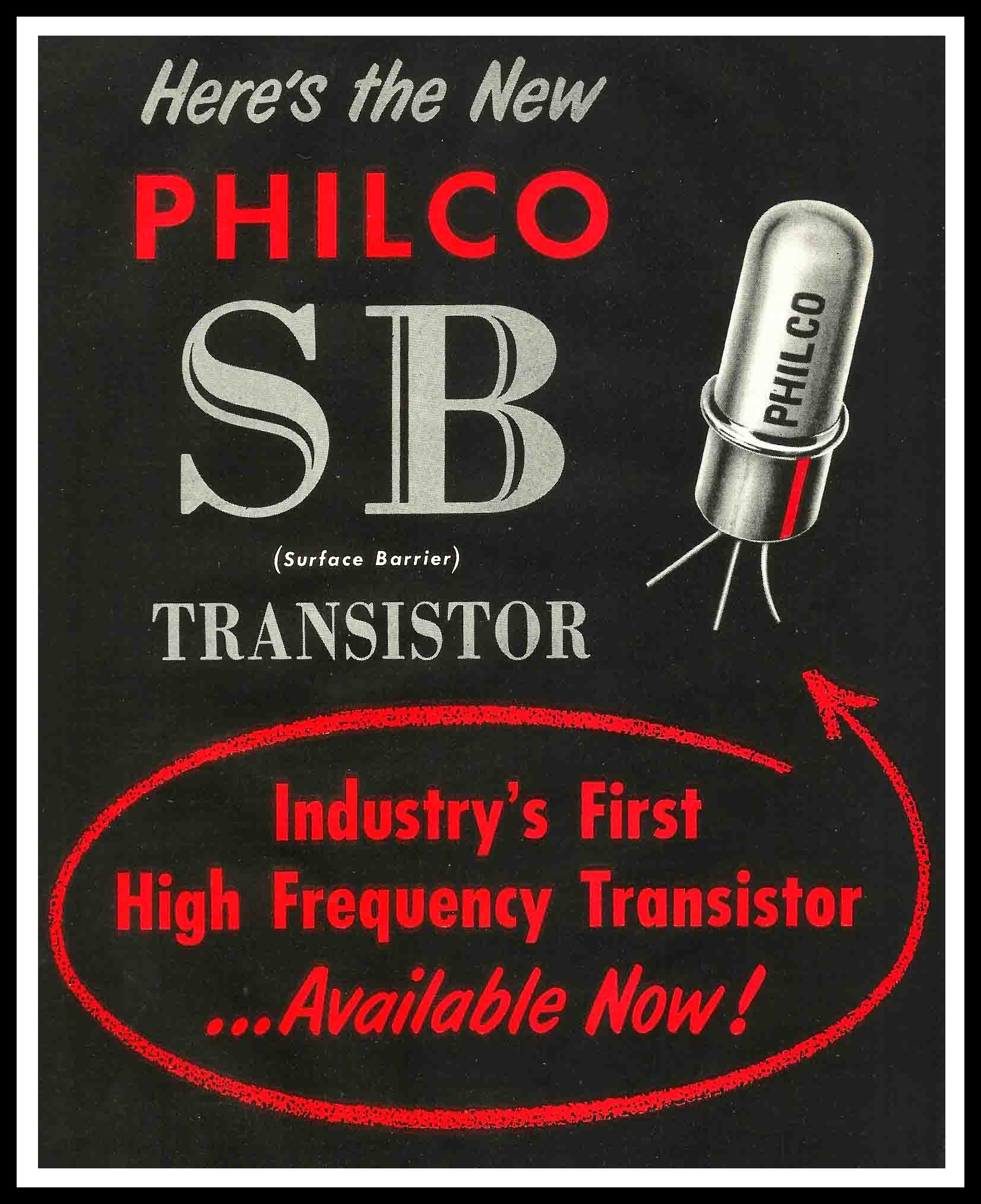
Philco SB100 surface-barrier transistor advertisement

The Philco high-frequency surface-barrier transistor was also the first transistor that was suitable for high-speed computers. Philco developed and produced a miniature transistorized computer called the Transac (for Transistor Automatic Computer, models C-1000 and C-1100), for the Navy's jet fighter planes in 1955.

In 1955, MIT's Lincoln Laboratory researchers started to design and build the first transistorized general purpose programmable 18-bit computer, called the TX-0. It was an experimental computer, used to test transistor logic circuitry and large capacity magnetic-core memory, and was completed and operational in April 1956. The TX-0 computer's circuitry consisted of 3600 transistors and used the Philco L-5122 transistor in its design. MIT's Lincoln Laboratory commenced the design and construction of a large-scale transistorized programmable 36-bit general purpose computer in 1957, which was called the TX-2. It was operational in 1958, and utilized 22,000 transistors that included Philco surface-barrier transistors.

In June 1955, Philco was awarded a contract with the National Security Agency to build a fully transistorized scientific computer. A world's first, the SOLO was later commercially marketed by Philco as the Transac S-1000. Also, later in 1955, Philco contracted with the United States Navy David Taylor Basin Research Unit to build a larger-scale fully transistorized computer using its surface-barrier transistor technology, named the CPXQ. It was later commercially marketed by Philco as the Transac S-2000 electronic data processing computer.

During 1955–56, Ferranti Canada was in charge of miniaturizing the Royal Canadian Navy's DATAR (Digital Automatic Tracking and Resolving) seaborne tactical data defense computer. Ferranti Canada had used Philco's SB-100 surface barrier transistors in its experimental transistorized prototype circuitry designs.

In late 1956, Ferranti Canada had built the world's first experimental transistorized computer mail-sorting system (Route Reference Computer). It was delivered to the Canadian Postal System in January 1957 and was capable of sorting 36,000 letters an hour. This experimental computerized mail-sorter used Philco SB-100 transistors.

Philco's Transac models S-1000 scientific computer and S-2000 electronic data processing computer were the world's first commercially produced large-scale all-transistor computers, which were introduced in 1957 and used surface-barrier transistors.

In June 1957, the Burroughs Corporation transistorized ground guidance computer (AN/GSQ-33) was built and installed at Cape Canaveral missile test range, for the United States Air Force's Atlas intercontinental ballistic missile defense system (ICBM). This system was designed by Burroughs engineer Issac Auerbach and used Philco's surface-barrier transistors.

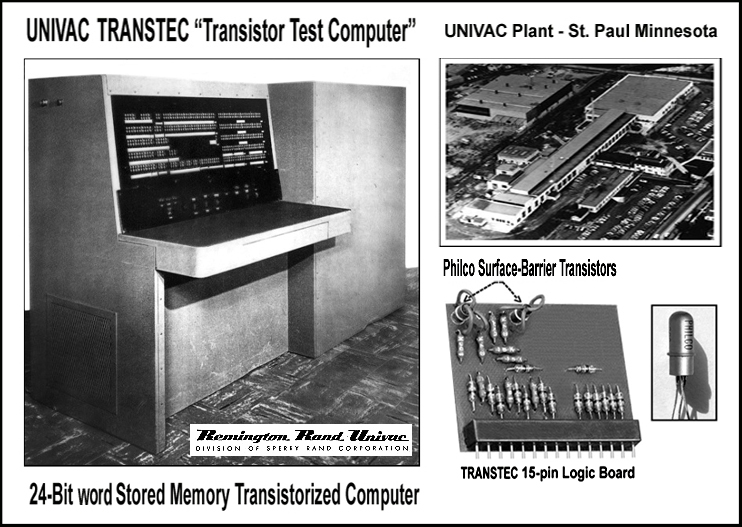
Univac TRANSTEC "test" transistorized computer with plug-in logic circuit board using Philco surface-barrier transistors.

In 1956–57, the Remington Rand St. Paul Univac division of Sperry Rand Corporation designed and built a transistorized test computer for the United States Air Force's Titan 1 ICBM system. Called TRANSTEC, it was designed by Univac's St. Paul engineer Seymour Cray, and used Philco's surface-barrier transistors. This was Univac's first computer designed with transistors and was used to test both transistor logic circuits and its speed and reliability, compared to magnetic amplifier (MAGSTEC) and vacuum tube circuit computers. After Univac had demonstrated the TRANSTEC computer to the United States Air Force, it was awarded a contract to build a transistorized ground guidance Athena ICBM defense computer.

In March 1958, Univac built and delivered a transistorized 30-bit AN/USQ-17 computer, for the United States Navy Tactical Data System (NTDS). It was designed by Seymour Cray starting in January 1957, and used Philco's surface-barrier transistors.

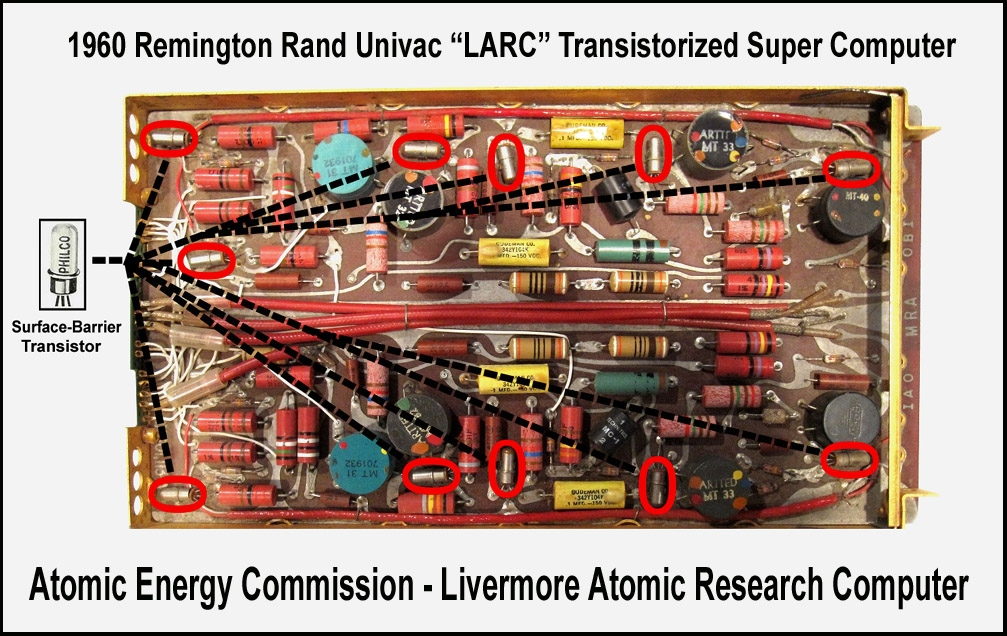
Univac LARC transistorized supercomputer memory-read amplifier circuit board using Philco's surface-barrier transistors-1960

Philco's surface-barrier transistors were also used in the design of the first transistorized supercomputer, the UNIVAC LARC (Livermore Advanced Research Computer). It was delivered to the Atomic Energy Commission / University of California's Lawrence Radiation Laboratory in May 1960. A second Univac LARC transistorized supercomputer using Philco's surface-barrier transistor technology was contracted and delivered in October 1960 to the United States Navy David Taylor Basin Research Unit.
