= Gallium(III) sulfate =

Names
- Other names: Digallium trisulfate

Identifiers
CAS Number	(anhydrous): 13494-91-2 (sulfates are wrong in CAS); (octadecahydrate): 13780-42-2
3D model (JSmol)	(anhydrous): Interactive image; (monohydrate): Interactive image; (octadecahydrate): Interactive image
ChemSpider	(anhydrous): 58307
EC Number	(anhydrous): 236-816-0
PubChem CID	(anhydrous): 64773; (monohydrate): 16213072; (hexahydrate): 129655091; (octadecahydrate): 91886266
CompTox Dashboard (EPA)	(anhydrous): DTXSID40890705
- InChI: InChI=1S/2Ga.3H2O4S/c;;3*1-5(2,3)4/h;;3*(H2,1,2,3,4)/q2*+3;;;/p-6 Key: UXLRWZBQRAWBQA-UHFFFAOYSA-H; (octadecahydrate): InChI=1S/2Ga.3H2O4S.18H2O/c;;3*1-5(2,3)4;;;;;;;;;;;;;;;;;;/h;;3*(H2,1,2,3,4);18*1H2/q2*+3;;;;;;;;;;;;;;;;;;;;;/p-6 Key: RBIKSELZKJNPFC-UHFFFAOYSA-H
- SMILES: (anhydrous): [O-]S(=O)(=O)[O-].[O-]S(=O)(=O)[O-].[O-]S(=O)(=O)[O-].[Ga+3].[Ga+3]; (monohydrate): O.[O-]S(=O)(=O)[O-].[O-]S(=O)(=O)[O-].[O-]S(=O)(=O)[O-].[Ga+3].[Ga+3]; (octadecahydrate): O.O.O.O.O.O.O.O.O.O.O.O.O.O.O.O.O.O.[O-]S(=O)(=O)[O-].[O-]S(=O)(=O)[O-].[O-]S(=O)(=O)[O-].[Ga+3].[Ga+3]

Properties
Chemical formula	Ga_{2}(SO_{4})_{3}
Molar mass	445.7 g/mol
Appearance	White solid
Density	3.86 g/cm^{3}
Melting point	680 °C (1,256 °F; 953 K) (decomposes)
Solubility in water	Slightly soluble

Hazards
- GHS labelling
Pictograms	(GHS07: Exclamation mark)
Signal word	Warning
Hazard statements	H315, H319, H335
Precautionary statements	P302+P352, P305+P351+P338
NFPA 704 (fire diamond)	0 0 1

Related compounds
Other cations	Aluminium sulfate, Indium(III) sulfate,
- Except where otherwise noted, data are given for materials in their standard state (at 25 °C [77 °F], 100 kPa). Infobox references

Gallium(III) sulfate refers to the chemical compound, a salt, with the formula Ga_{2}(SO_{4})_{3}, or its hydrates Ga_{2}(SO_{4})_{3}·xH_{2}O. Gallium metal dissolves in sulfuric acid to form solutions containing [Ga(OH_{2})_{6}]^{3+} and SO^{2−}_{4} ions. The octadecahydrate Ga_{2}(SO_{4})_{3}·18H_{2}O crystallises from these solutions at room temperature. This hydrate loses water in stages when heated, forming the anhydrate Ga_{2}(SO_{4})_{3} above 150 °C and completely above 310 °C. Anhydrous Ga_{2}(SO_{4})_{3} is isostructural with iron(III) sulfate, crystallizing in the rhombohedral space group R3̅.

== Preparation ==
Gallium(III) sulfate is prepared from the reaction of hydroxygallium diacetate and sulfuric acid. The two reactants were mixed at 90 °C and left for 2 days which produced the octadecahydrate. Then, it was dried in a vacuum for two hours which created the extremely hygroscopic anhydrous form. The overall reaction is below:

2 Ga(CH_{3}COO)_{2}OH + 3 H_{2}SO_{4} → Ga_{2}(SO_{4})_{3} + 4 CH_{3}COOH + 2 H_{2}O

After the production, it was confirmed to be the simple salt, Ga_{2}(SO_{4})_{3}, by x-ray diffraction.

== Properties ==
When heated over 680 °C, gallium sulfate gives off sulfur trioxide, yielding gallium(III) oxide. A gallium sulfate solution in water mixed with zinc sulfate can precipitate ZnGa_{2}O_{4}.

== Derivatives ==
Basic gallium sulfate is known with the formula (H_{3}O)Ga_{3}(SO_{4})_{2}(OH)_{6}.

Double gallium sulfates are known with composition NaGa_{3}(SO_{4})_{2}(OH)_{6}, KGa_{3}(SO_{4})_{2}(OH)_{6}, RbGa_{3}(SO_{4})_{2}(OH)_{6}, NH_{4}Ga_{3}(SO_{4})_{2}(OH)_{6}. These compounds are isostructural with jarosite and alunite. Jarosite and alunite can contain a small amount of gallium substituted for iron or aluminium. Organic base double gallium sulfates can contain different core structures, these can be chains of [Ga(SO_{4})_{3}]^{3-}, [Ga(OH)(SO_{4})_{2}]^{2-} or [Ga(H_{2}O)_{2}(SO_{4})_{2}]^{−} or sheets of [Ga(H_{2}O)_{2}(SO_{4})_{2}]^{−} units.

	formula	mw	crystal system	space group	unit cell Å	volume	density	properties	reference
	(H_{3}O)Ga_{3}(SO_{4})_{2}(OH)_{6}			R3̅m	a = 7.18 c = 17.17 z = 1.5	766			
	Ga_{4}(OH)_{10}SO_{4}								
	NH_{4}Ga_{3}(SO_{4})_{2}(OH)_{6}								
trisodium gallium sulfate	Na_{3}Ga(SO_{4})_{3}		tetragonal		a = 9.451 c = 7.097				
	NaGa_{3}(SO_{4})_{2}(OH)_{6}								
	KGa_{3}(SO_{4})_{2}(OH)_{6}								
	RbGa_{3}(SO_{4})_{2}(OH)_{6}								
Caesium gallium sulfate dodecahydrate	CsGa(SO_{4})_{2}12H_{2}O		cubic	Pa3	Z=4		2.127	refractive index=1.461	
dimethylammonium gallium sulfate hexahydrate	(CH_{3})_{2}NH_{2}Ga(SO_{4})_{2}·6H_{2}O							ferroeelastic	
guanidinium gallium sulfate	[C(NH_{2})_{3}]Ga(SO_{4})_{2}·6H_{2}O		hexagonal	P31m	a=11.82 c=9.13			ferroelectric	
Ethylenediammonium acid gallium sulfate	[C_{2}H_{10}N_{2}][H_{3}O][Ga(SO_{4})_{3}]								
Ethylenediammonium basic gallium sulfate	[C_{2}H_{10}N_{2}][Ga(OH)(SO_{4})_{2}]·H_{2}O								
Tetramethylenediammonium gallium sulfate	[C_{4}H_{14}N_{2}][Ga(H_{2}O)_{2}(SO_{4})_{2}]_{2}								
Hexamethylenediammonium gallium sulfate	[C_{6}H_{18}N_{2}][Ga(H_{2}O)_{2}(SO_{4})_{2}]_{2}								
