= Acromag =

American computer peripheral manufacturing company

Acromag, Inc
- Company type: Private
- Industry: Process Control
- Founded: 1957; 69 years ago
- Founder: Henry Patton
- Headquarters: Wixom, Michigan, United States
- Area served: Worldwide
- Products: Embedded systems, Process control equipment
- Number of employees: 70 (2024)
- Website: www.acromag.com

Acromag is an American company that manufactures embedded computing, process instrumentation, and distributed I/O products.

Established in 1957, Acromag started by building critical measurement instrumentation equipment for the petrochemical and aerospace industries. It went on to designs analog and digital control products for the industrial I/O and defense markets.

Acromag designed industrial I/O components which has led to developing ground loops, RFI/EMI noise, and temperature drift. Many products are available with agency approvals such as UL, cUL, FM, CSA, CE, ATEX, and others to assure precise operation in hostile environments.

== History ==
Acromag was founded in 1957 by Henry Patton, an early developer of solid-state magnetic amplifiers. Expanding from its first location in Detroit, Michigan, (now Southfield), Acromag later moved its headquarters to Wixom, Michigan.

It acquired Xembedded, LLC (formerly XycomVME) in 2012.

The company made a number of Embedded Board Innovations over the years, including:

- 1960s – Designed and manufactured temperature transmitters and thermo-electric metal testers
- 1970s – Rack-mount I/O systems and field-mount transmitters
- 1980s – Remote data acquisition systems; Exorbus and VMEbus I/O boards
- 1990s – μP-based signal conditioners; Industry Pack modules and carrier cards
- 2000s – Distributed I/O; PMC modules, PCI and CompactPCI I/O boards, reconfigurable FPGA modules
- 2010s – USB-configured instruments; XMC modules, VPX boards, industrial PCs
- 2016 – Offer contract manufacturing services

== Operations ==
The company has three product divisions: Embedded Computing Solutions, Process Control and Automation Solutions and Contract Manufacturing Services. Its product lines focus on manufacturing, military, scientific, public utility, and transportation applications.
