= Aluminium sulfate =

Chemical compound

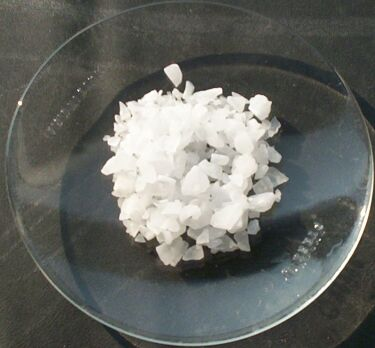
- Aluminium sulphate hexadecahydrate

Names
- IUPAC name Aluminium sulfate
- Other names: Aluminum sulfate; Aluminium sulphate; Cake alum; Filter alum; Papermaker's alum; Alunogenite; aluminium salt (3:2)

Identifiers
CAS Number	10043-01-3; 7784-31-8 (octadecahydrate)
3D model (JSmol)	Interactive image
ChemSpider	23233
ECHA InfoCard	100.030.110
EC Number	233-135-0
E number	E520 (acidity regulators, ...)
PubChem CID	24850
RTECS number	BD1700000
UNII	I7T908772F; TCS9L00G8F (octadecahydrate)
CompTox Dashboard (EPA)	DTXSID2040317
- InChI: InChI=1S/2Al.3H2O4S/c;;3*1-5(2,3)4/h;;3*(H2,1,2,3,4)/q2*+3;;;/p-6 Key: DIZPMCHEQGEION-UHFFFAOYSA-H; InChI=1/2Al.3H2O4S/c;;3*1-5(2,3)4/h;;3*(H2,1,2,3,4)/q2*+3;;;/p-6 Key: DIZPMCHEQGEION-CYFPFDDLAS
- SMILES: [Al+3].[Al+3].[O-]S(=O)(=O)[O-].[O-]S([O-])(=O)=O.[O-]S([O-])(=O)=O

Properties
Chemical formula	Al_{2}(SO_{4})_{3}
Molar mass	342.15 g/mol (anhydrous); 666.44 g/mol (octadecahydrate)
Appearance	white crystalline solid hygroscopic
Density	2.672 g/cm^{3} (anhydrous); 1.62 g/cm^{3} (octadecahydrate)
Melting point	770 °C (1,420 °F; 1,040 K) (decomposes, anhydrous); 86.5 °C (octadecahydrate)
Solubility in water	31.2 g/100 mL (0 °C); 36.4 g/100 mL (20 °C); 89.0 g/100 mL (100 °C)
Solubility	slightly soluble in alcohol, dilute mineral acids
Acidity (pK_{a})	3.3–3.6
Magnetic susceptibility (χ)	−93.0×10^{−6} cm^{3}/mol
Refractive index (n_{D})	1.47

Structure
Crystal structure	monoclinic (hydrate)

Thermochemistry
Std enthalpy of formation (Δ_{f}H^{⦵}_{298})	−3440 kJ/mol

Hazards
NFPA 704 (fire diamond)	1 0 0
- NIOSH (US health exposure limits)
PEL (Permissible)	none
REL (Recommended)	2 mg/m^{3}
IDLH (Immediate danger)	N.D.

Related compounds
Other cations	Gallium sulfate Magnesium sulfate
Related compounds	See Alum

Supplementary data page
- Aluminium sulfate (data page)
- Except where otherwise noted, data are given for materials in their standard state (at 25 °C [77 °F], 100 kPa). verify (what is ?) Infobox references

Aluminium sulfate is a salt with the formula Al_{2}(SO_{4})_{3}. It is soluble in water and is mainly used as a coagulating agent (promoting particle collision by neutralizing charge) in the purification of drinking water and wastewater treatment plants, and also in paper manufacturing.

The anhydrous form occurs naturally as a rare mineral millosevichite, found for example in volcanic environments and on burning coal-mining waste dumps. Aluminium sulfate is rarely, if ever, encountered as the anhydrous salt. It forms a number of different hydrates, of which the hexadecahydrate Al_{2}(SO_{4})_{3}·16H_{2}O and octadecahydrate Al_{2}(SO_{4})_{3}·18H_{2}O are the most common. The heptadecahydrate, whose formula can be written as [Al(H_{2}O)_{6}]_{2}(SO_{4})_{3}·5H_{2}O, occurs naturally as the mineral alunogen.

Aluminium sulfate is sometimes called alum or papermaker's alum in certain industries. However, the name "alum" is more commonly and properly used for any double sulfate salt with the generic formula XAl(SO_{4})_{2}·12H_{2}O, where X is a monovalent cation such as potassium or ammonium.

== Production ==
=== In the laboratory ===
Aluminium sulfate may be made by adding aluminium hydroxide, Al(OH)_{3}, to sulfuric acid, H_{2}SO_{4}:

2 Al(OH)_{3} + 3 H_{2}SO_{4} → Al_{2}(SO_{4})_{3} + 6 H_{2}O

or by heating aluminium in a sulfuric acid solution:

2 Al + 3 H_{2}SO_{4} → Al_{2}(SO_{4})_{3} + 3 H_{2}↑

=== From alum schists ===
The alum schists employed in the manufacture of aluminium sulfate are mixtures of iron pyrite, aluminium silicate and various bituminous substances, and are found in upper Bavaria, Bohemia, Belgium, and Scotland. These are either roasted or exposed to the weathering action of the air. In the roasting process, sulfuric acid is formed and acts on the clay to form aluminium sulfate, a similar condition of affairs being produced during weathering. The mass is now systematically extracted with water, and a solution of aluminium sulfate of specific gravity 1.16 is prepared. This solution is allowed to stand for some time (in order that any calcium sulfate and basic iron(III) sulfate may separate), and is then evaporated until iron(II) sulfate crystallizes on cooling; it is then drawn off and evaporated until it attains a specific gravity of 1.40. It is now allowed to stand for some time, and decanted from any sediment.

=== From clays or bauxite ===
In the preparation of aluminium sulfate from clays or from bauxite, the material is gently calcined, then mixed with sulfuric acid and water and heated gradually to boiling; if concentrated acid is used no external heat is generally required as the formation of aluminium sulfate is exothermic. It is allowed to stand for some time, and the clear solution is drawn off.

=== From cryolite ===
When cryolite is used as the ore, it is mixed with calcium carbonate and heated. By this means, sodium aluminate is formed; it is then extracted with water and precipitated either by sodium bicarbonate or by passing a current of carbon dioxide through the solution. The precipitate is then dissolved in sulfuric acid.

== Uses ==
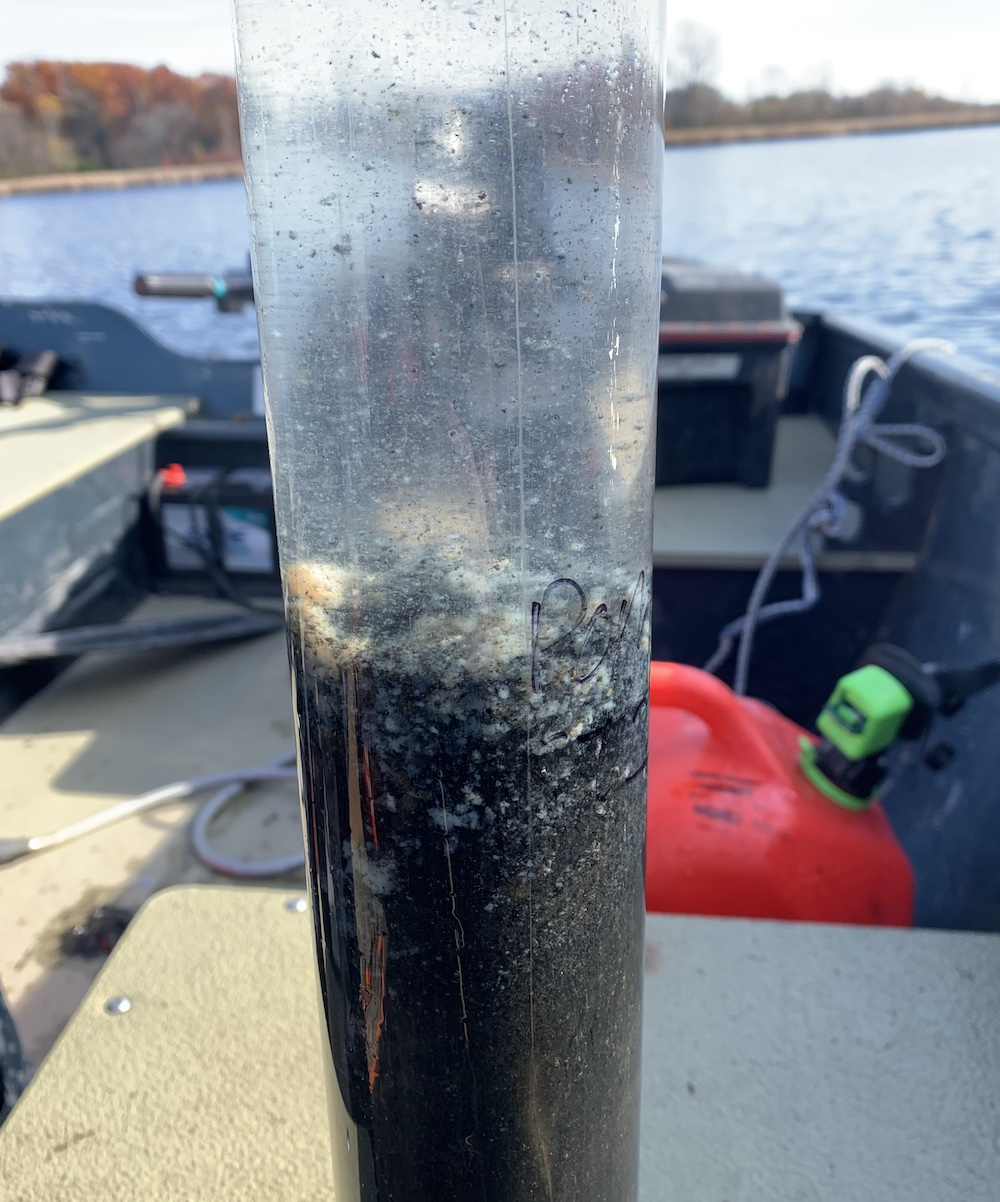
Sediment core sampled from a Minnesota lake. Aluminium sulfate flocs are pictured as white clumps near the sediment surface.

Aluminium sulfate is sometimes used in the human food industry as a firming agent, where it takes on E number E520, and in animal feed as a bactericide. In the United States, the FDA lists it as "generally recognized as safe" with no limit on concentration. Aluminium sulfate may be used as a deodorant, an astringent, or as a styptic for superficial shaving wounds. Aluminium sulfate is used as a mordant in dyeing and printing textiles.

It is a common vaccine adjuvant and works "by facilitating the slow release of antigen from the vaccine depot formed at the site of inoculation."

Aluminium sulfate is used in water purification and for chemical phosphorus removal from wastewater. It causes suspended impurities to coagulate into larger particles and then settle to the bottom of the container (or be filtered out) more easily. This process is called coagulation or flocculation. Research suggests that in Australia, aluminium sulfate used in this way in drinking water treatment is the primary source of hydrogen sulfide gas in sanitary sewer systems. An improper and excess application incident in 1988 polluted the water supply of Camelford in Cornwall.

Aluminium sulfate has been used as a method of eutrophication remediation for shallow lakes. It works by reducing the phosphorus load in the lakes.

When dissolved in a large amount of neutral or slightly alkaline water, aluminium sulfate produces a gelatinous precipitate of aluminium hydroxide, Al(OH)_{3}. In dyeing and printing cloth, the gelatinous precipitate helps the dye adhere to the clothing fibers by rendering the pigment insoluble.

Aluminium sulfate is sometimes used to reduce the pH of garden soil, as it hydrolyzes to form the aluminium hydroxide precipitate and a dilute sulfuric acid solution. An example of what changing the pH level of soil can do to plants is visible when looking at Hydrangea macrophylla. The gardener can add aluminium sulfate to the soil to reduce the pH which in turn will result in the flowers of the Hydrangea turning a different color (blue). The aluminium is what makes the flowers blue; at a higher pH, the aluminium is not available to the plant.

In the construction industry, it is used as waterproofing agent and accelerator in concrete. Another use is a foaming agent in fire fighting foam.

It can also be very effective as a molluscicide, killing spanish slugs.

Mordants aluminium triacetate and aluminium sulfacetate can be prepared from aluminium sulfate, the product formed being determined by the amount of lead(II) acetate used:

Al_{2}(SO_{4})_{3} + 3 Pb(CH_{3}CO_{2})_{2} → 2 Al(CH_{3}CO_{2})_{3} + 3 PbSO_{4}

Al_{2}(SO_{4})_{3} + 2 Pb(CH_{3}CO_{2})_{2} → Al_{2}SO_{4}(CH_{3}CO_{2})_{4} + 2 PbSO_{4}

== Chemical reactions ==
The compound decomposes to γ-alumina and sulfur trioxide when heated between 580 and 900 °C. It combines with water forming hydrated salts of various compositions.

Aluminium sulfate reacts with sodium bicarbonate to which foam stabilizer has been added, producing carbon dioxide for fire-extinguishing foams:

Al_{2}(SO_{4})_{3} + 6 NaHCO_{3} → 3 Na_{2}SO_{4} + 2 Al(OH)_{3} + 6 CO_{2}

The carbon dioxide is trapped by the foam stabilizer and creates a thick foam which will float on top of hydrocarbon fuels and seal off access to atmospheric oxygen, smothering the fire. Chemical foam was unsuitable for use on polar solvents such as alcohol, as the fuel would mix with and break down the foam blanket. The carbon dioxide generated also served to propel the foam out of the container, be it a portable fire extinguisher or fixed installation using hoselines. Chemical foam is considered obsolete in the United States and has been replaced by synthetic mechanical foams, such as AFFF which have a longer shelf life, are more effective, and more versatile, although some countries such as Japan and India continue to use it.
