= Aluminium sulfate (data page) =

Chemical data page

This page provides supplementary chemical data on aluminium sulfate.

== Material Safety Data Sheet ==
The handling of this chemical may incur notable safety precautions. It is highly recommend that you seek the Material Safety Datasheet (MSDS) for this chemical from a reliable source and follow its directions.

- ScienceLab.com
