= Transorma =

Mail sorting machine

The Transorma was the first large-scale multi-position mail sorting machine, built by the Dutch heavy industrial company, Werkspoor. The name is an acronym for "TRANsport and SORting, Marchand and Andriessen", the last names of the inventors.

Transorma machines had up to five stations where letters were presented one at a time to operators who read the address, selected a routing code that was typed onto the front of the letter, and then sent it off to be automatically sorted into one of up to 300 chutes. Several models were offered; the first U.S. postal station to install a Transorma system used the "5/300" model, which supported 5 sorters and 300 bins. Smaller models, like the "1/150", were similar in concept but were operated by a single sorter and used different mechanism for the sorting.

The Transorma was introduced in the Netherlands in 1927, and the first production version started operations in Rotterdam in 1930. Further sales in the Netherlands followed, but widespread adoption was interrupted by World War II. New installations followed after the war and the machines spread around the world during the 1950s. However, they were used for only a short period of time before computerized systems replaced them in the 1960s.

== History ==
=== Manual sorting ===
Traditional manual mail sorting broke the routing task into a hierarchy of sorting stations. Letters were delivered to sorters who examined the address and placed it in one of a number of "pigeon holes". At smaller sorting offices, the pigeon holes could represent individual delivery routes. Runners would collect all the mail from a particular route's pigeon hole from all of the sorting stations in the office and then hand it off to the deliverymen.

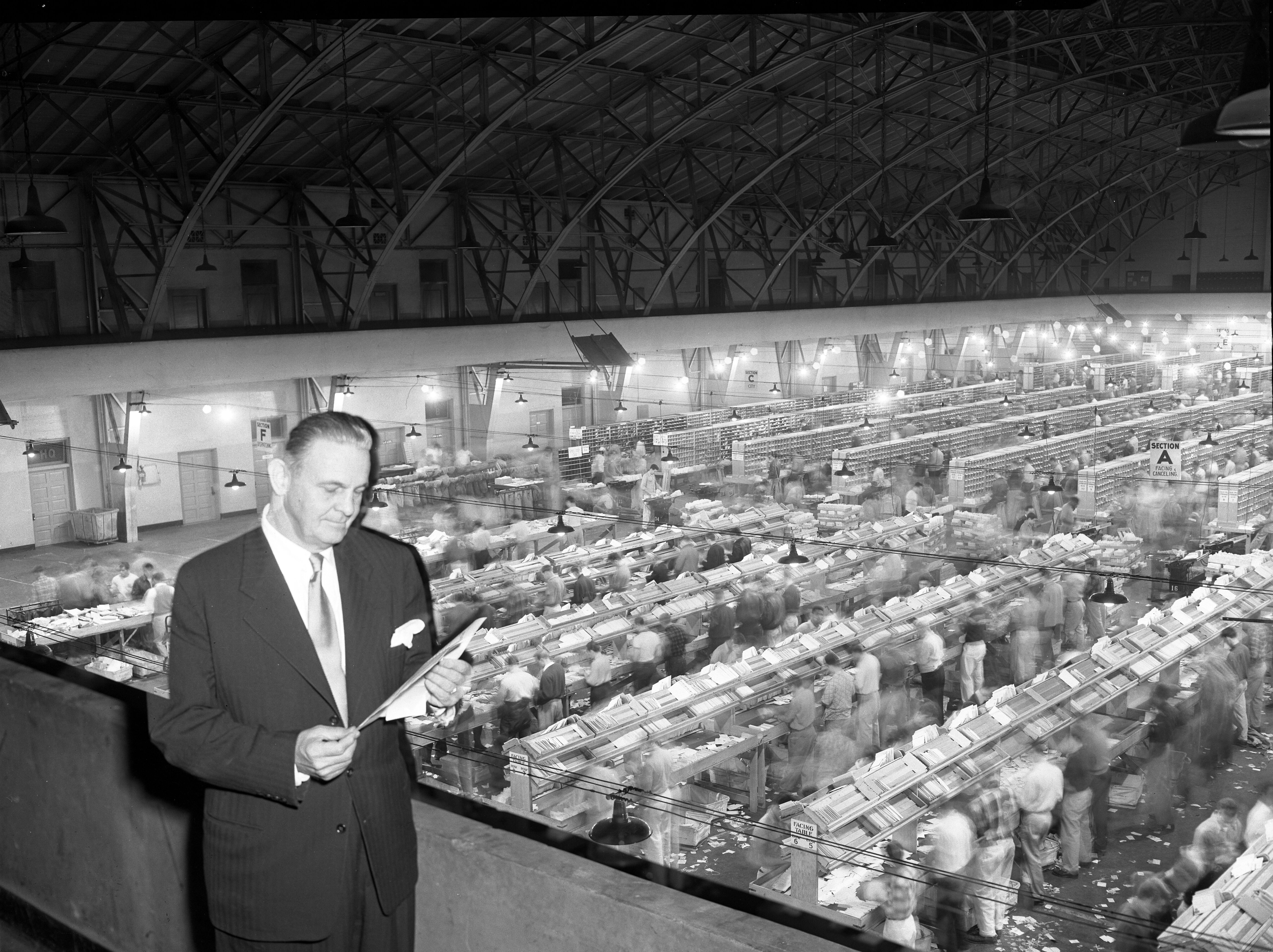
This image shows a typical manual sorting station, in this case in Los Angeles in 1951. Mail is separated and cleaned up on the desks closest to the camera, and then sorted in the rows of pigeon holes further away.

At larger sorting stations there were many potential routes, and a single sorter could not be expected to remember them all. For instance, all the out-of-state mail routed to New York state might be sent to a single state-wide sorting station, as stations in other states could not be expected to know how to route to various cities within New York. Sorters at the station would sort the mail by general geographical area, perhaps "Buffalo area" or "Albany". The letters in these pigeon holes would be collected up and sent to other sorting stations, perhaps for the branch office that served a single town, where it would be sorted again to the routes within that city. Mail might have to go through several sorting steps before it reached the level of the deliveryman.

One of the fundamental limits on the number of routes a single sorter could service was the length of their arms. This limited the stack of pigeon holes to a cabinet three to four feet on a side. Making the pigeon holes smaller allowed any one sorter to have more of them within reach, but increased the effort needed to place the letter in the bin, as well as reducing the number of letters that could be sent to a given destination before the pigeon hole filled up. Most stations had about two dozen pigeon holes, which demanded huge numbers of sorters to handle large volumes of mail and routes.

=== Transorma ===
Transorma was an attempt to solve the problem of providing more pigeon holes for any one sorter through the use of mechanical switching. Instead of the operator placing the mail directly in a pigeon hole, the machinery would do this for them. This not only greatly increased the number of pigeon holes a sorter could "reach", it also allowed each bin to be much larger, reducing the number of times mail had to be collected out of them.

Sorters read the address and selected a routing code on a keyboard. The machine typed the normally two-letter routing code onto the front of the mail in colored ink, allowing it to be sorted by hand at other offices. The machine then used the same typed route to set up a series of mechanical switches in the mechanism and then moved the mail to the proper bin, often at a long distance from the sorter. In theory, the machine could be expanded to any number of bins, but the majority had either 250 or 300.

The Transorma was first displayed in 1927. The first machine was installed in Rotterdam in 1929 and started full operation in 1930. Another was set up in Haarlem, followed by installations in Utrecht, Breda (a 1/150), 's-Hertogenbosch (Den Bosch) and 's-Gravenhage (The Hague). The original machine in Rotterdam was used until July 1968, and one of these was sent to the Museum voor Communicatie in 1981.

In the U.K. a similar machine had been displayed at the 1924 British Empire Exhibition, but not installed. A decade later, two 5/250 machines were set up in Brighton, officially opening on 7 October 1935. The machines remained in use until 25 May 1968, and were broken up for scrap the next month.

A 5/300 was demonstrated at the 1939 New York World's Fair in New York City, in partnership with Pitney-Bowes who acted as Werkspoor's local sales agent. No sales were made before the war started. Another international sale was made to Rio de Janeiro, which started operation until 1940. In 1942 the Germans moved one of the Dutch Transormas to Steglitz in Berlin and another to Mönchengladbach in the Ruhr. The Mönchengladbach machine was destroyed by bombing in 1943.

=== Post-war sales ===
Two were installed in Belgium in 1947, one in Brussels and another in Ghent. Further sales to Brazil were interrupted by the war, but in the post-war period another was set up in São Paulo in 1952, and Belo Horizonte in 1954. Argentina purchased several Transormas following the war, Buenos Aires started their 5/300 in 1948, followed by 5/300's in Rosario and Bahía Blanca in 1949, and another 1/160 in Bahía Blanca in 1955. Venezuela installed a 5/300 in Caracas in 1956.

Transormas were also tested in Linköping and Norrköping in Sweden in 1949 and used through 1950 before the test was abandoned. They felt that the machines placed too much demand on the sorter's memories to be truly effective. Although they were concerned about this problem, the Canadian Post Office installed a 5/300 at their new sorting office in Peterborough, Ontario, in 1955. This machine operated only until 1963, when it was shut down and later sold for scrap in early 1964. Even prior to the Transorma installation, the Canadians had started work on a computerized system that looked up addresses as well as sorted the mail, the Route Reference Computer.

On 10 April 1957 the first U.S. Transorma, a 5/300, started operation at the Blair Station Post Office in Silver Spring, Maryland. At the time it was launched with great fanfare, described at the time "as history-making as the Pony Express, the train, and the plane in speeding up mail handling." However, the U.S. Post Office by this time had seen the Canadian Route Reference Computer prototype and was in the process of launching an effort to build a similar system. The Silver Spring machine was the only Transorma to be installed in the U.S. A plaque is all that remains of this installation, after the buildings were removed in 2003.

Another Transorma was used in Providence (Rhode Island) in early 1960s.

== Description ==
The larger multi-position Transorma machines were 13 foot (4 m) tall, 50 ft (15 m) long and about 20 ft (6.1 m) wide, and weighed 31,000 lb (14,000 kg). They were arranged as a two-story structure with the delivery bins on the bottom and the sorting stations on top. The upper area was ringed by a walkway protected by handrails.

Mail was first sized to remove non-standard packages, and then fed onto a long conveyor belt running from the ground floor up to the sorting stations on the top. The sorting stations would extract letters from the belt and place them at the back of a large queue of letters that for each of the operators. The operators were presented with letters one at a time at the front of the queue, and selected a two-letter routing code from memory.

Once the route was selected, the code was typewritten onto the front of the letter, typically in colored ink printed 90 degrees to the written address. The letter then dropped through the sorting station into a row of spinning wheels that propelled the letter through the bin area. Mechanical shutters, activated by the same keypad entries, opened to allow the letter to drop through into the bins. The bins were much larger than a typical pigeon hole, reducing the number of collections. In full operation, the 5/300 Transorma could sort 15,000 letters per hour. This was about double the rate that the same number of clerks could sort by hand.

The single-user machines were considerably different. These machines were a single floor with the operator sitting at one end. Letters were picked up from the machine and sent to a conveyor running above the sorting bins, then dropped when it was over the right column of bins. A series of shutters behind the bins selected the right one in the stack. Basic workflow was otherwise unchanged.
