= Route Reference Computer =

Mail sorter system

Ferranti Canada's Route Reference Computer was the first computerized mail sorter system, delivered to the Canadian Post Office in January 1957. Despite a promising start and a great deal of international attention, spiraling costs and a change in government led to the project being canceled later that year. Technical developments pioneered for the Route Reference Computer were put to good use by Ferranti in several projects that followed over the next decade.

== History ==
=== Sorting problems ===
In the immediate post-war era, Canada experienced explosive growth in urban population as veterans returning from World War II moved into the cities looking for work in the newly industrialized country. This created logjams at mail routing offices that handled the mail for what used to be much smaller cities. Whereas the formerly rural population spread out the sorting and delivery of mail, now sixty percent of all the mail was being sorted at only ten processing stations, leading to lengthy delays and complaints that reached to the House of Commons.

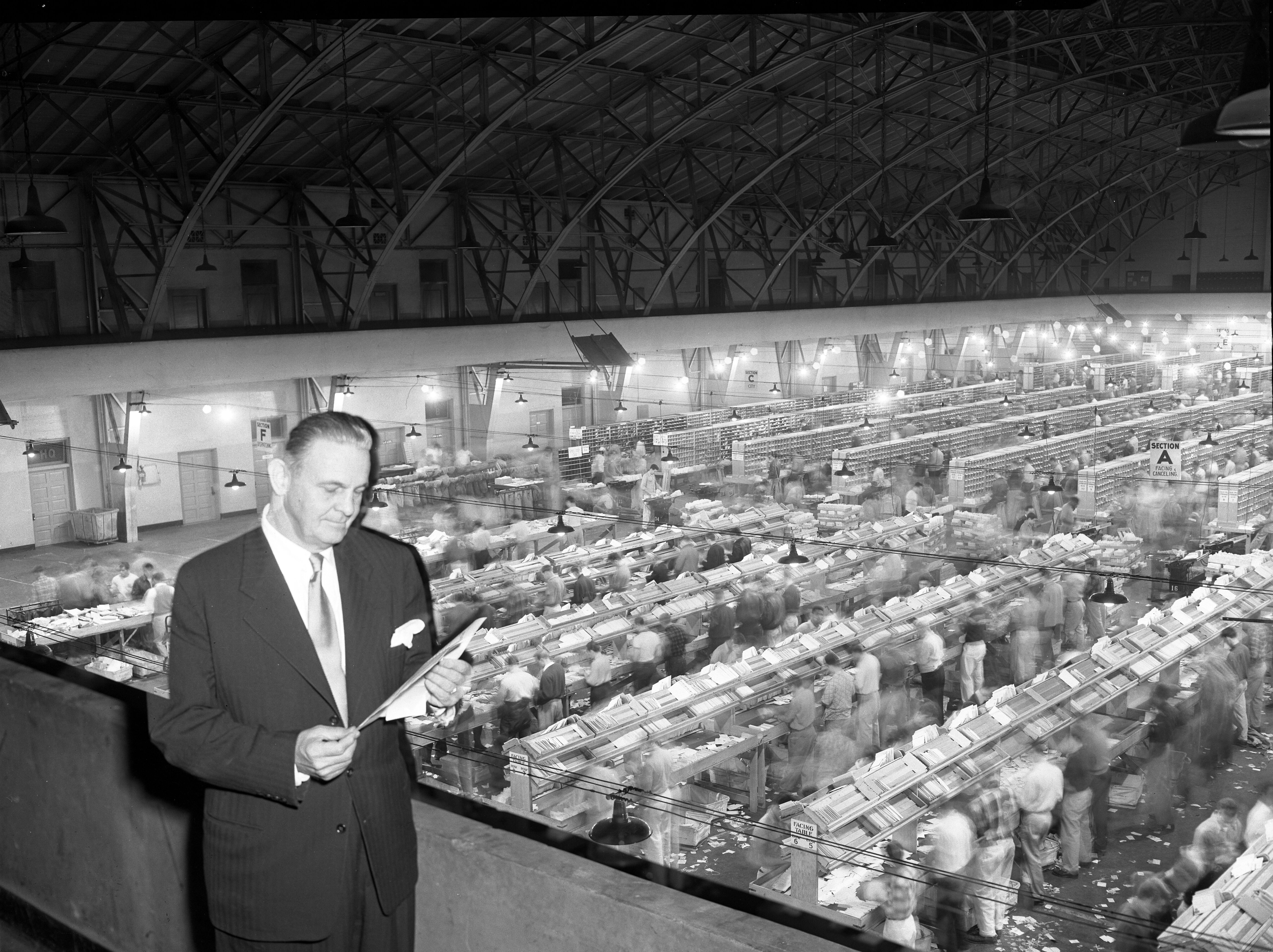
This image shows a typical manual sorting station, in this case in Los Angeles in 1951. Mail is separated and cleaned up on the desks closest to the camera, and then sorted in the rows of pigeon holes further away.

At the time, a mail sorter could be expected to sort mail into one of about two dozen "pigeon holes", small bins that collected all of the mail being delivered to a particular mail route. The sorter had to memorize addresses and the routes that served them, reading the address off a letter and placing it into the correct pigeon hole. In a small town each pigeon hole could represent the mail carried by a single deliveryman, and each sorter could remember the streets and sort mail for any of these routes. But for mail that was being delivered across larger areas, the sorting had to be broken into a hierarchy. A receiving station in Alberta routing a letter to Ontario would sort it into the Ontario stack. The mail would then be received in Ontario and sorted at a distribution center to stacks for city or towns. If the city was large enough, it might have to be sorted several more times before it reached an individual carrier.

During the 1940s the Post Office Department had introduced "postal zones" in certain cities to help spread out sorting into regional offices. For instance, as of 1943 Toronto was divided into 14 zones. Letters with zones could be routed directly to the regional sorting office, skipping one sorting step and speeding the delivery of the mail. Using the zones for addressing was not mandatory and was up to the sender to include this if they knew it, and the Post Office urged users to add the new codes to their mail.

=== Automation ===
At the time, the primary constraint for the number of pigeon holes a sorter could serve was the length of the human arm, which limited the stack of holes to a cabinet about 4 feet on a side. A number of companies sold sorting equipment that overcame this by moving the mail on a conveyor to a large array of bins. One of the most widely used at that time was the Transorma, which supported up 5 sorters at a time and sorted to as many as 300 destination bins. In practice, the Transorma simply changed the limiting problem; while the number of bins was now essentially unlimited, there was no way the sorters could be expected to remember so many routes. The limitation changed from physical to mental.

Convinced that automation was the proper solution to the routing problem, in 1951 O.D. Lewis at Post Office headquarters in Ottawa started looking for ways to solve the memory limitation. Although Lewis did not have a technical background, he was aware of the IBM systems being used for tallying pencil-marked punched cards. He suggested that a similar system could be used for sorting mail, but a better solution for printing the routing information would be to use "a code of vertical bars on the back of the letter. Or, if a virtually colourless conductive marking fluid could be developed, then the front cover could be used."

He imagined a system where the address would simply be typed into the system and converted to barcode with no attempt by the operator to do any routing. A machine, with practically unlimited memory, would then read the route and sort it to the proper bin. Only the machine would have to know the routes, and with enough memory, any one of them could sort mail directly to its destination. Lewis noted that such a system would replace sorters with typists, which could be hired in great numbers from existing typing pools.

Deputy Postmaster General William Turnbull, under pressure from the seated government to improve postal service, turned to Lewis' ideas. In 1952 Turnbull and Lewis started looking around the industry to find systems that might fill their needs, but came up empty handed. Although there were a wide variety of patents that had been filed for such systems, none had been turned into working machinery. They approached the National Research Council (NRC) for help, but found a similar lack of ideas there. Failing to find a machine that was immediately available, they installed a Transorma at their new sorting office in Peterborough, Ontario, as an interim measure. It started operations in 1955 and ran until 1963.

Maurice Moise Levy had recently left the Defence Research Board to set up a Canadian subsidiary of ITT Corporation known as FEMCO, short for "Federal Electric Manufacturing Co." Turnbull met with Levy in April 1952 and asked him if a sorting machine was possible, Levy immediately answered "yes." Levy followed this up with a proposal for a $100,000 contract for detailed engineering development. After the NRC examined the proposal and passed judgement that it seemed possible, Turnbull pressed for development of the system. Under further pressure from the opposition and problems staffing the Toronto office, Postmaster General Alcide Côté announced the project in July 1952.

=== Electronic Information Handling System ===
As chance would have it, Levy had recently been fired by ITT and was hired by Turnbull. He set up the small in-house Electronics Laboratory with the promise of having a prototype machine ready for testing in three years. In early 1953 he visited companies looking for potential development partners, and through this process he met with Arther Porter, head of R&D at Ferranti Canada.

At the time, Ferranti was in the midst of developing the DATAR system for the Royal Canadian Navy. DATAR was a vacuum tube-based drum memory computer that stored and collected data for display. Radar and sonar operators on any of the ships in a convoy could send contact reports to DATAR using a trackball-equipped display that sent the data over a UHF PCM radio link. DATAR stored the data on the drum and periodically sent out the complete dataset to the ships, which plotted them on local displays, rotated and scaled for that ship's position in the convoy. The result was a single unified picture of the entire battlefield that could be seen on any of the ships, even those without direct contact with the targets.

Porter suggested using the DATAR computer design as the basis for a sorting system. Following Lewis' suggestion, a new reader would sort the mail on the basis of the pattern of stripes on the letter provided by an operator who simply typed in the address without attempting to route it. Ferranti suggested a fluorescent ink instead of a conductive one. Routing information would be placed on the magnetic drum, which could store thousands of routes and could be easily changed on demand. Levy, however, was interested in using an optical memory system being developed at IBM by a team including Louis Ridenour (see Automatic Language Translator for details) for storage of the routing information. Turnbull overruled Levy, and on 10 August 1954 he signed a contract with Ferranti for the Electronic Information Handling System using a drum memory.

In February 1955 Levy announced the system to the world at a conference in the U.S., claiming that it was able to process 200,000 letters per hour. For comparison, the largest Transnorma systems could handle about 15,000 letters an hour. Although the computer system did appear to be able to meet this claim, they were having serious problems with the non-computer portions of the project.

=== Route Reference Computer ===
Levy and Turnbull pressed for development of a production system, while Porter was suggested they move to a transistorized version of the computer. Porter had made the same proposal to the Navy in order to cure the size and reliability problems they were having the tube-based DATAR, and had signed a contract for a transistorized DATAR in early 1955. Since the Navy was paying for much of the development of the circuitry, the new machine would be inexpensive to develop. Porter offered a $65,000 contract for the new computer, known as the Route Reference Computer, which Turnbull signed in August 1955.

Ferranti had based both proposals on Philco's SB-100 transistor and their Transac logic circuit design. In production both proved to be less developed than hoped. The SB-100 was unreliable, and even working versions varied so widely in performance that the Transac logic circuits were unusable. Making matters worse, in late 1955 the Navy was forced to cancel development of the transistorized DATAR, placing the entire development cost on the Post Office budget. Ferranti burned through the initial $65,000 by early 1956, and several additional rounds of funding followed. Since the Post Office had no other plans on the books to address their problems, these were always forthcoming.

By August 1956 the project was three times its original budget, and when Turnbull demanded an update, Ferranti finally told Levy about the problems they were having with the Transac circuitry and stated they had been forced to abandon it to develop their own. Their new design worked, but the equivalent circuits were larger and this caused problems trying to fit them into the original chassis. Levy, reporting back, was admonished by Turnbull, who was under increasing pressure to deliver the system. That month, Progressive Conservative Postmaster critic William McLean Hamilton pressed for an update on "this million dollar monster", and given an end-of-year date that was also missed.

The machine was finally delivered in January 1957, and Turnbull was able to display it in working fashion that summer when the Universal Postal Union held its Congress meeting in Ottawa, the first in Canada. Interest was high, prompting postmasters from England and Germany to visit Ottawa to see the system, along with a similar visit by several U.S. Congressmen. Hopes of international sales were dimmed when the Congressmen returned to Washington and quickly arranged $5 million in funding for local development of a similar system. Burroughs Corporation won a development contract the next year, emerging as the Multiple Position Letter Sorting Machine in the early 1960s.

By this point the budget for development had reached $2.5 million. During 1957 federal election the Progressive Conservative Party of Canada ran a campaign that aimed at what they characterized as Louis St. Laurent's out-of-control spending. Nevertheless, when Hamilton took over the role of Postmaster General in August 1957, instead of canceling the project he pressed Turnbull to install a production system as quickly as possible. Turnbull stated that they could have a system installed within six months, and Hamilton agreed to continue funding the project, but noted that he would accept no further delays.

Turnbull's estimate proved overly optimistic, and development of the mechanical portions of the system dragged on until further funding was curtailed and Levy's Electronics Laboratory was finally shut down. Turnbull quit the Deputy position in 1958. Their initial failure using automation slowed the adoption of newer systems, and Canada was one of the last major western nations to introduce Postal Codes, which didn't appear until the 1970s.

=== Success through failure ===
Although the mail sorting machine was eventually broken up for scrap, it was highly influential outside of Canada. Lewis' original suggestion that some sort of invisible or see-through ink be used to store routing information on the front face of the letters is now practically universal, as is the basic workflow of the address being converted to bar code form as soon as possible by typists and then sent into automated machinery for actual sorting. Use of bar-coded ZIP codes printed directly at the sending point when using postage meters became mandatory in the U.S. in 1973. During the 1960s the use of optical character readers replaced typists for letters with typewritten addresses, and in the 1990s, handwritten ones as well.

Ferranti prospered from the development effort as they adapted their new transistorized circuit design for a series of follow-on projects. Shortly after the Route Reference Computer was delivered, they were contacted by the Federal Reserve Bank to develop a similar system for check sorting that was very successful. Ferranti later the same basic system as the basis of ReserVec, a computer reservations system built for Trans Canada Airlines (today's Air Canada) that started full operation in October 1961, beating the more famous SABRE. The basic ReserVec design would later be generalized into the Ferranti-Packard 6000 mainframe business computers, whose design became the basis for the ICT 1900 series of machines during the 1960s.
