= Magnetic logic =

Digital logic based on non-linear magnetic effects

Magnetic logic is digital logic made using the non-linear properties of wound ferrite cores. Magnetic logic represents 0 and 1 by magnetising cores clockwise or anticlockwise.

Examples of magnetic logic include core memory. Also, AND, OR, NOT and clocked shift logic gates can be constructed using appropriate windings, and the use of diodes.

A complete computer called the ALWAC 800 was constructed using magnetic logic, but it was not commercially successful. The Elliott 803 computer used a combination of magnetic cores (for logic function) and germanium transistors (as pulse amplifiers) for its CPU. It was a commercial success.

William F. Steagall of the Sperry-Rand corporation developed the technology in an effort to improve the reliability of computers. In his patent application, filed in 1954, he stated:

"Where, as here, reliability of operation is a factor of prime importance, vacuum tubes, even though acceptable for most present-day electronic applications, are faced with accuracy requirements of an entirely different order of magnitude. For example, if two devices each having 99.5% reliability response are both utilized in a combined relationship in a given device, that device will have an accuracy or reliability factor of .995 × .995 = 99%. If ten such devices are combined, the factor drops to 95.1%. If, however, 500 such units are combined, the reliability factor of the device drops to 8.1%, and for a thousand, to 0.67%. It will thus be seen that even though the reliability of operation of individual vacuum tubes may be very much above 99.95%, where many thousands of units are combined, as in the large computers, the reliability factor of each unit must be extremely high to combine to produce an error free device. In practice of course such an ideal can only be approached. Magnetic amplifiers of the type here described meet the necessary requirements of reliability of performance for the combinations discussed."

Magnetic logic is able to achieve switching speeds of about 1MHz but was overtaken by semiconductor based electronics which is able to switch much faster.

Solid state semiconductors were able to increase their density according to Moore's law, and thus proved more effective as IC technology developed.

Magnetic logic has advantages in that it is not volatile, it may be powered down without losing its state.

== See also ==
- Electropermanent magnet
- Magnetic amplifier
- Parametron
- Hewitt Crane
