= Chemical phosphorus removal =

Wastewater treatment method

Chemical phosphorus removal is a wastewater treatment method, where phosphorus is removed using salts of aluminum (e.g. alum or polyaluminum chloride), iron (e.g. ferric chloride), or calcium (e.g. lime). Phosphate forms precipitates with the metal ions and is removed together with the sludge in the separation unit (sedimentation tank, flotation tank, etc.).

== Aluminum sulfate treatment to reduce phosphorus content of lakes ==
One method of eutrophication remediation is the application of aluminum sulfate, a salt commonly used in the coagulation process of drinking water treatment. Aluminum sulfate, or "alum" as it is commonly referred, has been found to be an effective lake management tool by reducing the phosphorus load.

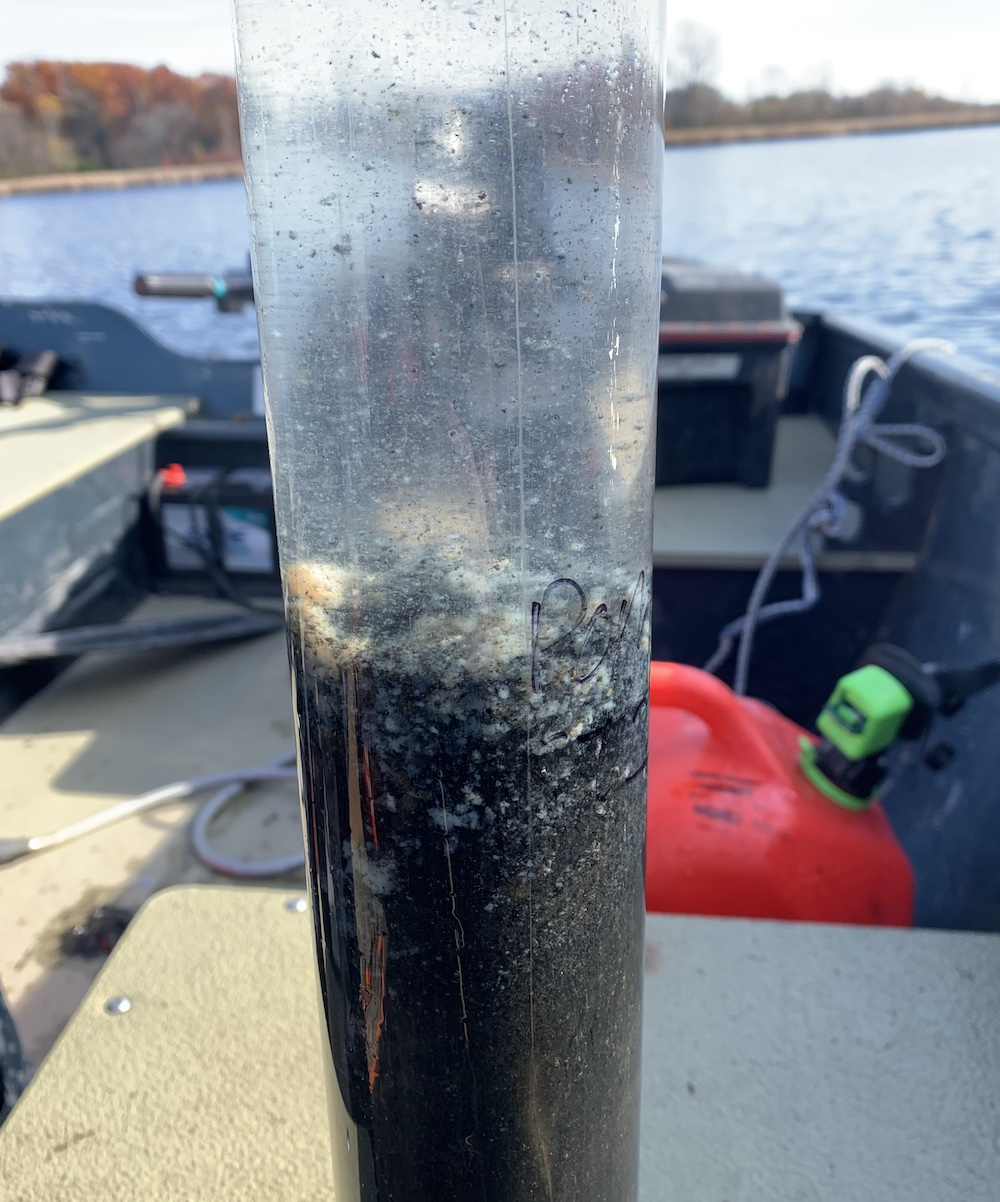
Sediment core sampled from a Minnesota lake. Aluminum sulfate flocs are depicted as white clumps near the sediment surface.

Alum was first applied in 1968 to a lake in Sweden. Its first application to an American lake followed in 1970. Today, alum has been utilized with improved effectiveness and understanding. In a large scale study, 114 lakes were monitored for the effectiveness of alum at phosphorus reduction. Across all lakes, alum effectively reduced the phosphorus for 11 years. While there was variety in the longevity (21 years in deep lakes and 5.7 years in shallow lakes), the results express the effectiveness of alum at controlling phosphorus within lakes.

=== Mechanism ===
Alum treatment begins with the addition of aluminum sulfate salt to a water body. Once added, the salt dissolves and dissociates, introducing Al(III) ions to the water. The aluminum ions participate in a series of hydrolysis reactions, forming different aluminum species across pH ranges. As more aluminum sulfate is added, water pH decreases. At higher pH, the soluble species Al(OH)_{4}^{−} is present. In neutral pH ranges (6–8), the insoluble aluminum hydroxide (Al(OH)_{3}) occurs. As pH decreases further, the Al(III) ion remains present.

Maintaining optimal pH is important for the removal of phosphorus from water. Phosphorus is most effectively removed at the neutral pH range, when the insoluble aluminum hydroxide is present. This hydroxide functions as a Lewis acid, creating a flocculation environment similar to conventional wastewater treatment. The insoluble Al(OH)_{3} floc adsorbs phosphorus, as well as other species, and removes them from the water column. As floc adsorption continues, the floc becomes larger, eventually settling to the bottom of the water column in the sediment. The resulting aluminum hydroxide layer covering the lake bottom additionally blocks the diffusion of phosphorus from sediment into the water column, further regulating internally loaded phosphorus.

=== Implementation ===
For most alum treatments, aluminum sulfate salt is applied to substrate at the lake's bottom, within the hypolimnion. The alum then reduces phosphorus levels by inactivating the phosphorus released from these lake sediments, thereby controlling phosphorus in the entire water column. This phosphorus supplied from within the lake sediments is known as "internally loaded" phosphorus, as opposed to "externally loaded" phosphorus supplied by sources outside the lake, such as runoff.

Although alum is typically applied to the hypolimnion, reducing phosphorus universally within the lake, it may also be applied to the epilimnion or locally to point sources. This style of alum treatment is similar to the use of alum in conventional water treatment, and is more effective at reducing externally loaded phosphorus than universal application of alum to the hypolimnion. When applied to the epilimnion, boats powered by an outboard motor are deployed onto a lake carrying aluminum sulfate. After determining the necessary dosage and location of the application, the aluminum sulfate is added to the surface of the lake near the wake of the outboard motor. This provides sufficient mixing of the aluminum sulfate within the epilimnion.

The necessary dosage of alum is determined by a variety of parameters. Changes in pH, dissolved oxygen levels, metal content of lake sediment, and lake size are all important for consideration. Alum dosage is calculated by scientist and engineers to increase the effectiveness.

=== Limitations ===
Alum treatment is less effective in deep lakes, as well as lakes with substantial external phosphorus loading. In deep lakes, the inactivation of phosphorus is not spread throughout the entire water column, as it is in shallower lakes due to the localization of aluminum hydroxide to the hypolimnion. Furthermore, externally loaded phosphorus often diffuses slowly downward from the lake surface, limiting its interaction with aluminum hydroxide within the hypolimnion and allowing phosphorus accumulation higher in the water column. Therefore, alum treatment is most effectively applied to shallow lakes with primarily internally loaded phosphorus. One exception is point sources of externally loaded phosphorus, which can be effectively regulated by direct application of aluminum sulfate to the source.

Another physical property to be considered is the ability of a lake to withstand mixing in the water column. Lakes with a higher Osgood Index, a parameter used to determine the amount of mixing a that occurs in a lake due to wind, have been found to result in more effective alum treatment. Another parameter is the ratio of the watershed area to the lake surface area. Lakes with lower watershed to lake area ratios experienced greater longevity following treatment. These lakes tend to be correlated with longer residence times and tend to be influenced by internally loaded phosphorus which aids in successful treatment. Regardless of application strategy, repeated alum treatment is often necessary for most lakes every 5 to 15 years. The necessity of repeated treatment requires continuous management and phosphorus monitoring to ensure optimal effectiveness.

Biological implications are another important consideration of alum treatment. Treatments increase water clarity, which has been correlated with increased plant growth at greater depths within the lake. Increased plant growth within lakes changes the character of the substrate, which is sometimes a factor in biodiversity. Lakes with benthic feeding fish such as carp tend to have lower success at removing phosphorus. These species forage in lake sediments which disturbs the aluminum hydroxide flocs binding phosphorus to the lake bottom. An additional concern is that aluminum salts can acidify lakes, making them potentially toxic to aquatic organisms. However, the aluminum sulfate dosage used for lake treatment is not often high enough to pose significant toxicity to fish, although declines in algae and invertebrates have been observed in treated lakes. The alum dosage is also insufficient to cause toxicity in humans, and is often similar to alum doses used in conventional drinking water treatment. To reduce negative biological effects, the accepted limit for dissolved aluminum concentrations in a water body is 50 μg Al/L and pH should be restricted to a range of 5.5-9.
