= Mail sorting =

Postal system methods for routing mail

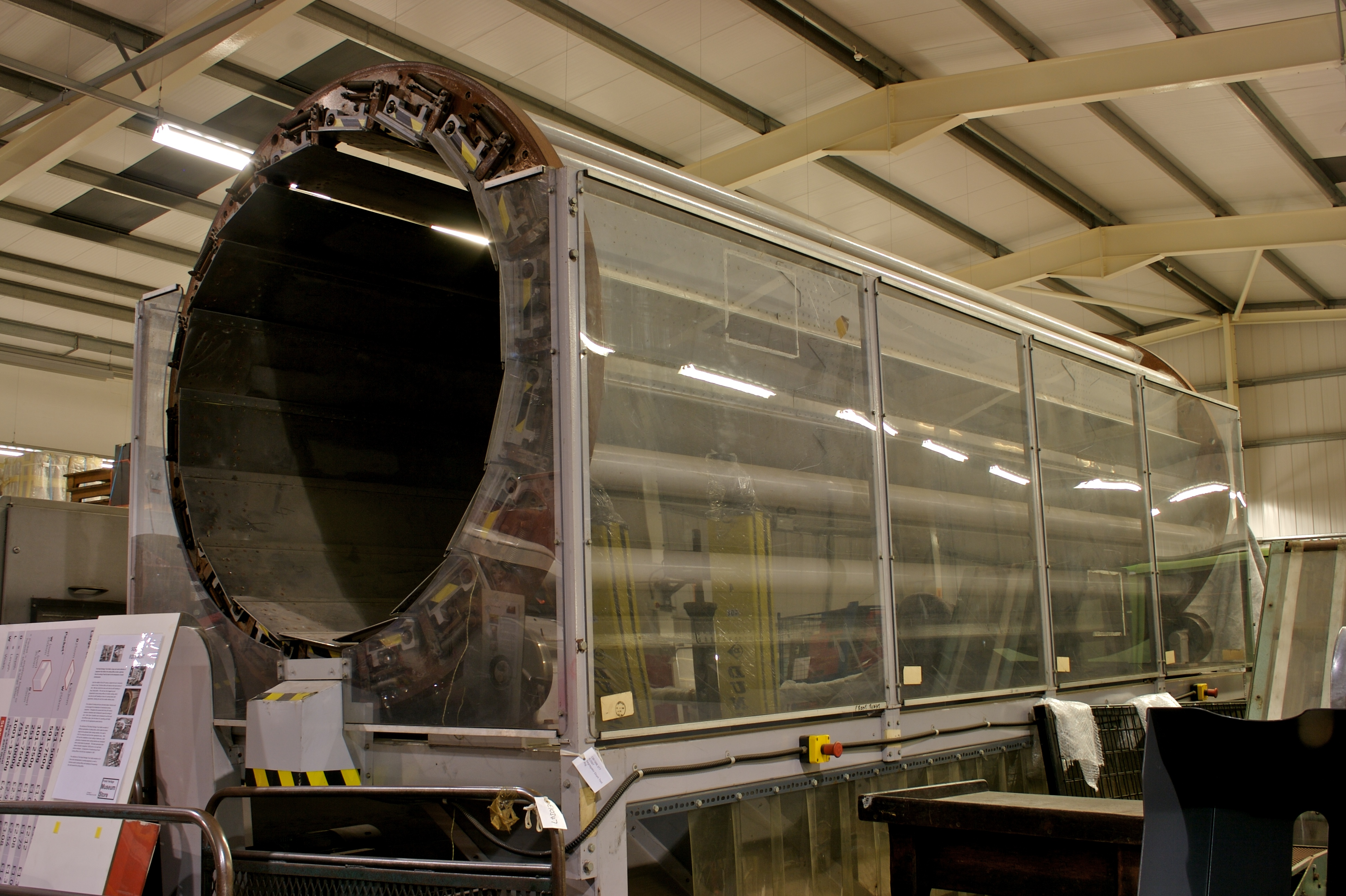
Automated postal sorting equipment of British Royal Mail

Mail sorting refers to the methods by which postal systems determine how and where to route mail for delivery. Once accomplished by hand, mail sorting is now largely automated through the aid of specialized machines. The first widely adopted mail sorting machine was the Transorma, first made operational in Rotterdam in 1930.

Mail sorting systems are now also used by corporations and other mailers to presort mail prior to delivery in order to earn discounts on postage. In the United States, for example, presort discounts can reduce the cost of First-Class Mail from $0.42 to as low as $0.324. Many companies also use mail sorters to handle incoming mail such as checks, orders and correspondence.

== History ==
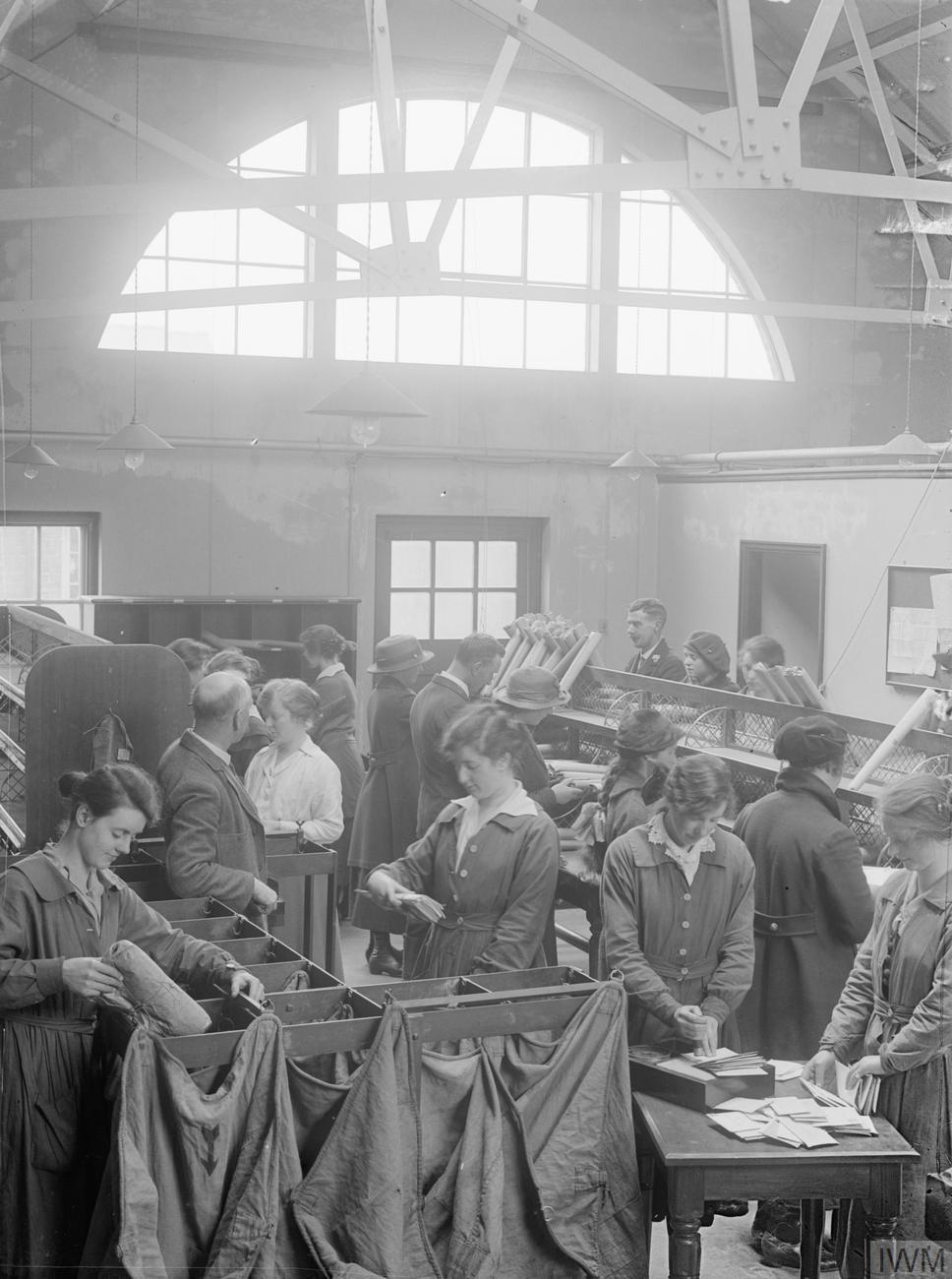
Mail sorting by hand at Gretna munitions township during World War I

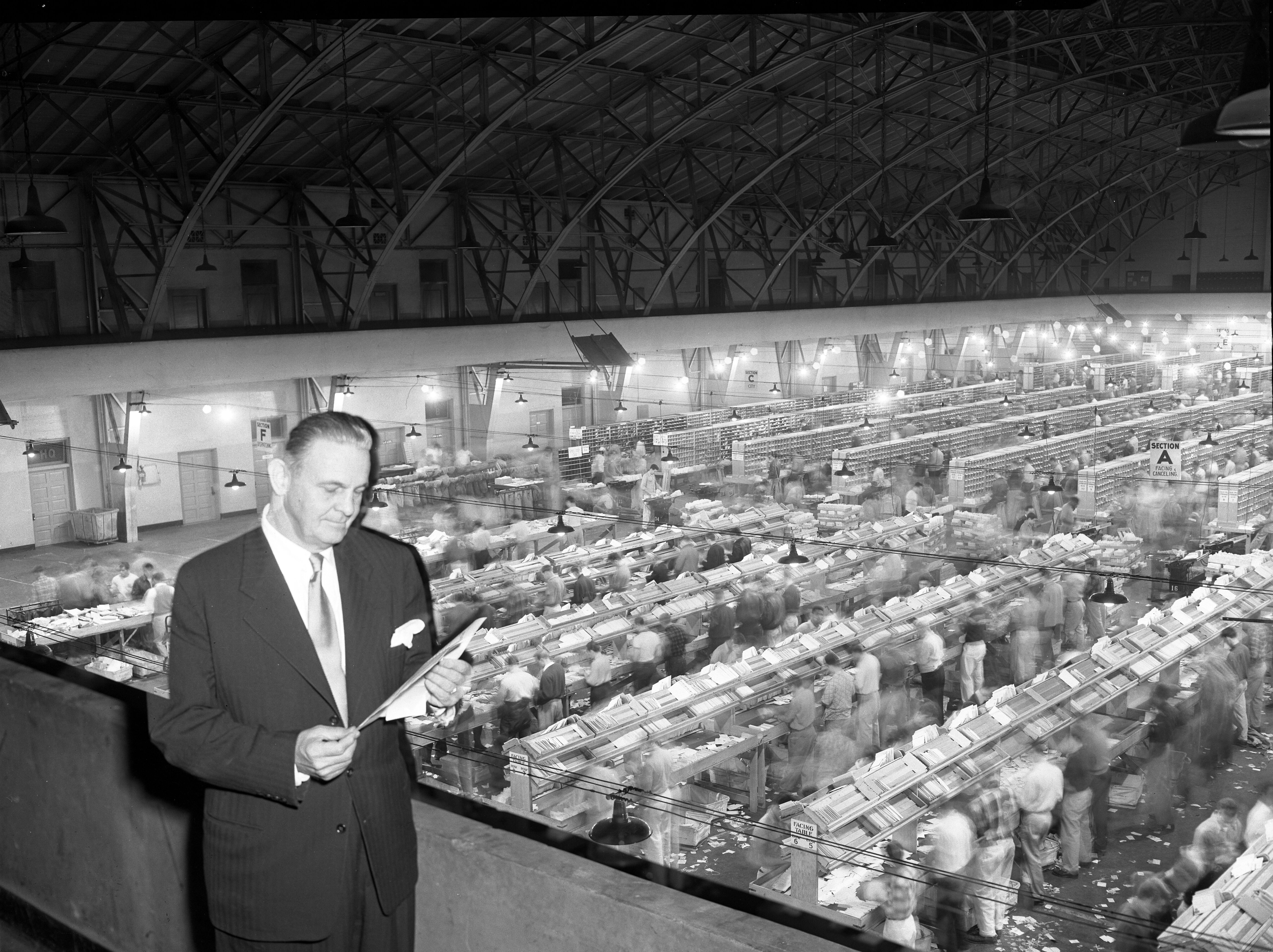
Postal employees sorting mail by hand, Los Angeles, 1951

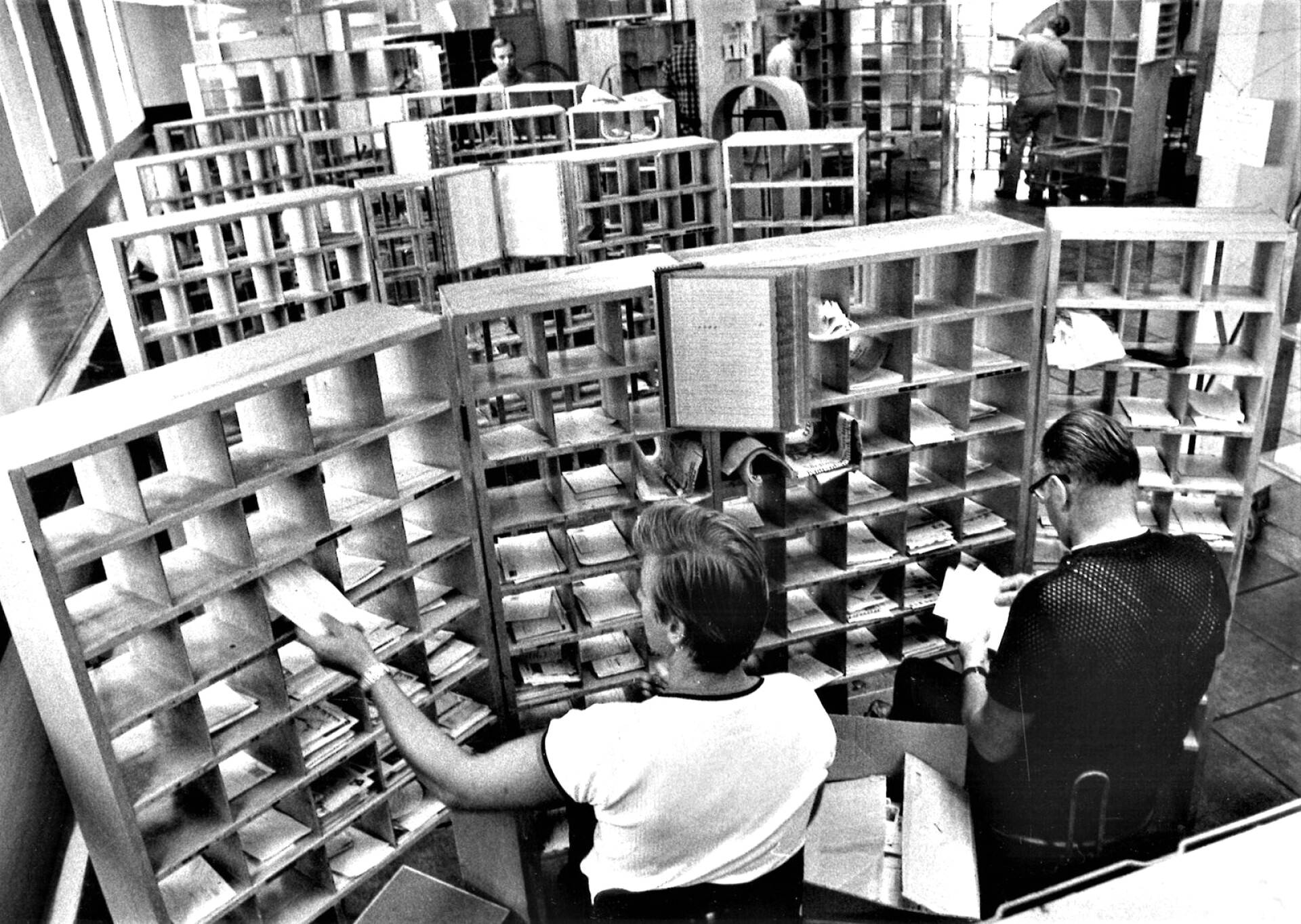
A Finnish hand mail sorting facility, 1972

For much of the 20th century, mail was sorted by hand using what is called a "pigeon-hole messagebox" method. Addresses were read and manually slotted into specific compartments. Early forms of a mechanical mail sorter were developed and tested in the 1920s. The Transorma, manufactured by the Dutch company Werkspoor, was first operated in Rotterdam in 1930 and then spread to other Dutch cities. By the mid 1950s, Transormas had been introduced to Brazil, Belgium, Argentina, Venezuela, and Canada. The Transorma 5/300 consisted of an upper and lower section, a conveyor belt transport and a series of five sorting keyboards. Operators read the destination and keyed a sorting code. The letter was then automatically transferred to a letter tray and deposited into one of 300 chutes. The Transorma could sort 15,000 letters per hour.

=== United States ===
To handle rapidly growing mail volumes, the United States Postal Service installed its first semiautomatic sorting machine, a Transorma 5/300 distributed by Pitney Bowes, on April 10, 1957. The machine doubled the throughput of letters that the same number of clerks could do by hand.

In 1965, the postal service put the first high-speed optical character reader into operation that could handle a preliminary sort automatically. The first computer-driven single-line optical character reader—which reads the mailpiece destination address then prints a barcode on the envelope that could be used to automate mail sorting from start to finish—was employed in 1982.

With the U.S. Postal Service introduction of postal worksharing, ZIP + 4 and the POSTNET barcode in 1980, companies were given an incentive to sort their mail prior to inducting it at the Post Office. Today, presort and automation discounts can save companies up to 50% or more on postage—and many companies use mail sorters to sort both incoming and outgoing mail.

== Outgoing mail sorters ==
Mail sorters can process up to 55,000 #10 envelopes per hour. Systems can scan and archive mail piece images during the sort process for compliance and proof of mailing. Multi-line optical character reader technology can also read and validate both machine-print and handwritten pieces.

== Incoming mail sorters ==
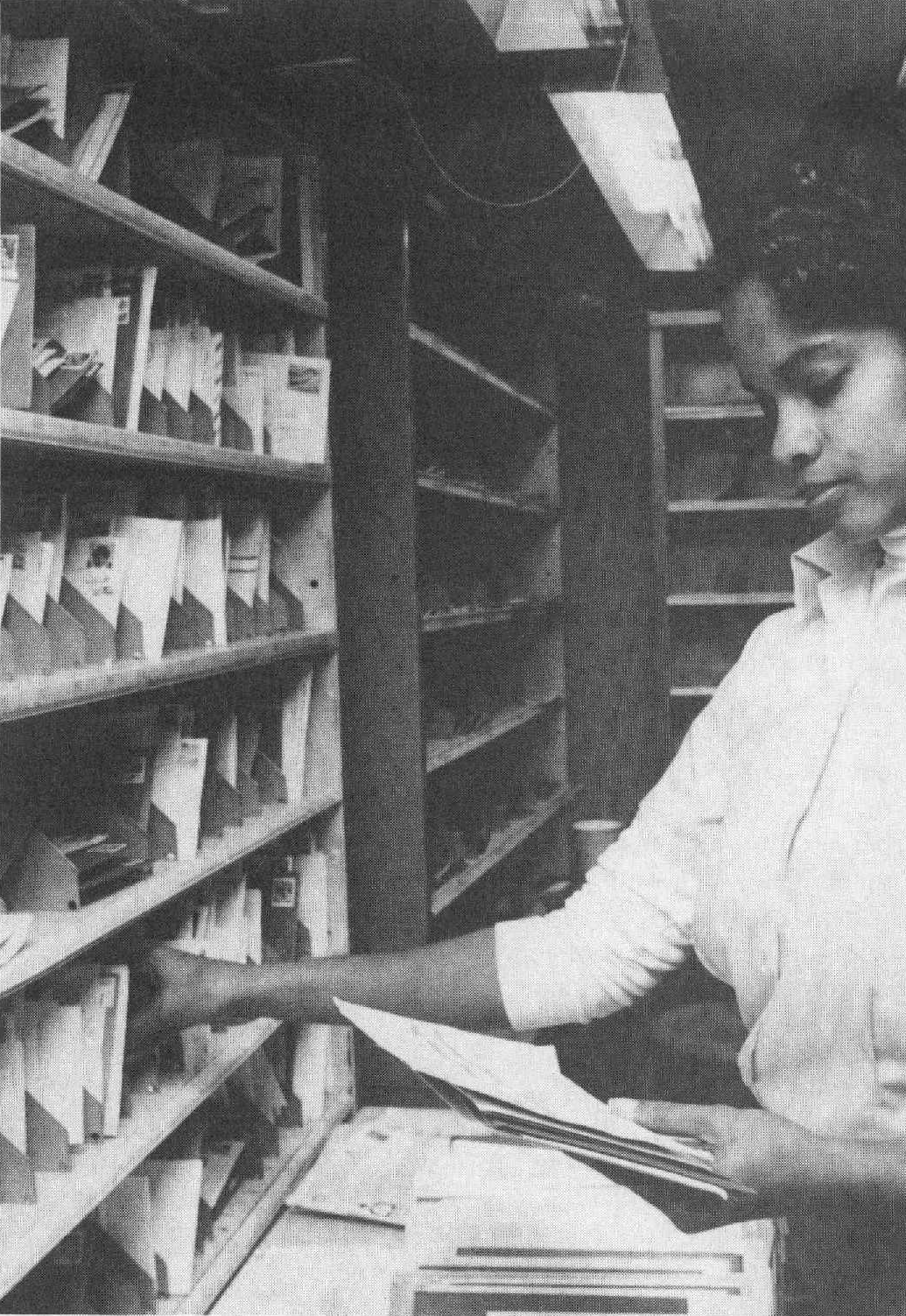
Manual mail sorter. (1992)

Companies who receive a high-volume of incoming mail, including remittance checks, orders and correspondence, use mail sorters to help ensure that mail reaches the right person or department quickly and efficiently.

== Video coding ==
Video coding refers to entering address details manually if they cannot be retrieved automatically by OCR software. The address details on the postal items will be scanned by the sorting machine and this image will be sent to a computer that is connected to the network. Professionally trained data specialists receive the image, enter the correct address details and send them back, so that the sorting machine can sort the mail properly. Video coding is a crucial process for parcel and postal logistics providers, as 3–7% of all shipments require manual data entry.

== New technologies ==
Recent innovations allow for mixed mail sorting—providing for postal discounts on letters, small parcels, flat mailers, irregularly shaped pieces, padded envelopes and even polywrap sheets.

In 2007, the USPS introduced shape-based pricing which offered more significant postal discounts for mailers who sorted flat-sized mailpieces. In response to this postal change, the market responded with new low-cost systems designed specifically to support flat mail sorting for mailers who process between 500 and 10,000 first class flats per day.

Nowadays, internet of things-based automation systems are installed with the mail sorters which send automatic notifications in case of any failure of equipment. This leads to high productivity as the machine is running for maximum time without any failure.
