= Magnetic amplifier =

Electromagnetic device

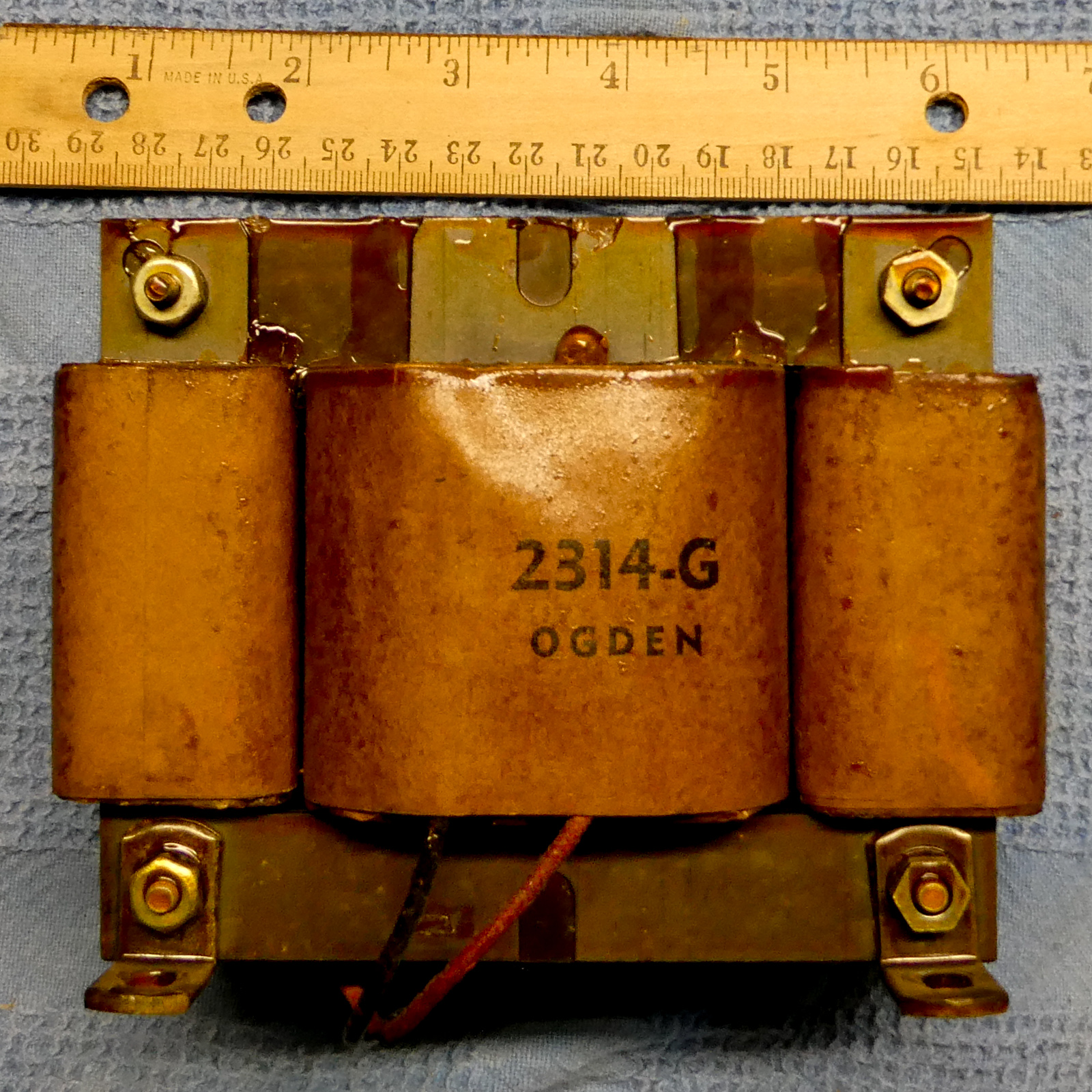
- A small magnetic amplifier rated at 250 watts and designed to operate on 120 VAC, 60 Hz. The large center winding is the control winding.

The magnetic amplifier (colloquially known as a "mag amp") is an electromagnetic device for amplifying electrical signals. The magnetic amplifier was invented early in the 20th century, and was used as an alternative to vacuum tube amplifiers where robustness and high current capacity were required. World War II Germany perfected this type of amplifier, and it was used in the V-2 rocket. The magnetic amplifier was most prominent in power control and low-frequency signal applications from 1947 to about 1957, when the transistor began to supplant it. The magnetic amplifier has now been largely superseded by the transistor-based amplifier, except in a few safety critical, high-reliability or extremely demanding applications. Combinations of transistor and mag-amp techniques are still used.

== Principle of operation ==
A saturable reactor, illustrating the principle of a magnetic amplifier

Visually a mag amp device may resemble a transformer, but the operating principle is quite different from a transformer – essentially the mag amp is a saturable reactor. It makes use of magnetic saturation of the core, a non-linear property of a certain class of transformer cores. For controlled saturation characteristics, the magnetic amplifier employs core materials that have been designed to have a specific B-H curve shape that is highly rectangular, in contrast to the slowly tapering B-H curve of softly saturating core materials that are often used in normal transformers.

The typical magnetic amplifier consists of two physically separate but similar transformer magnetic cores, each of which has two windings: a control winding and an AC winding. Another common design uses a single core shaped like the number "8" with one control winding and two AC windings as shown in the photo above. A small DC current from a low-impedance source is fed into the control winding. The AC windings may be connected either in series or in parallel, the configurations resulting in different types of mag amps. The amount of control current fed into the control winding sets the point in the AC winding waveform at which either core will saturate. In saturation, the AC winding on the saturated core will go from a high-impedance state ("off") into a very low-impedance state ("on") – that is, the control current controls the point at which voltage the mag amp switches "on".

A relatively small DC current on the control winding is able to control or switch large AC currents on the AC windings. This results in current amplification.

Two magnetic cores are used because the AC current will generate high voltage in the control windings. By connecting them in opposite phase, the two cancel each other, so that no current is induced in the control circuit. The alternate design shown above with the "8" shaped core accomplishes this same objective magnetically.

== Strengths ==
The magnetic amplifier is a static device with no moving parts. It has no wear-out mechanism and has a good tolerance to mechanical shock and vibration. It requires no warm-up time. Multiple isolated signals may be summed by additional control windings on the magnetic cores. The windings of a magnetic amplifier have a higher tolerance to momentary overloads than comparable solid-state devices. The magnetic amplifier is also used as a transducer in applications such as current measurement and the flux gate compass. The reactor cores of magnetic amplifiers withstand neutron radiation extremely well. For this special reason magnetic amplifiers have been used in nuclear power applications.

== Limitations ==
The gain available from a single stage is limited and low compared to electronic amplifiers. Frequency response of a high-gain amplifier is limited to about one-tenth the excitation frequency, although this is often mitigated by exciting magnetic amplifiers with currents at higher than utility frequency. Solid-state electronic amplifiers can be more compact and efficient than magnetic amplifiers. The bias and feedback windings are not unilateral and may couple energy back from the controlled circuit into the control circuit. This complicates the design of multistage amplifiers when compared with electronic devices.

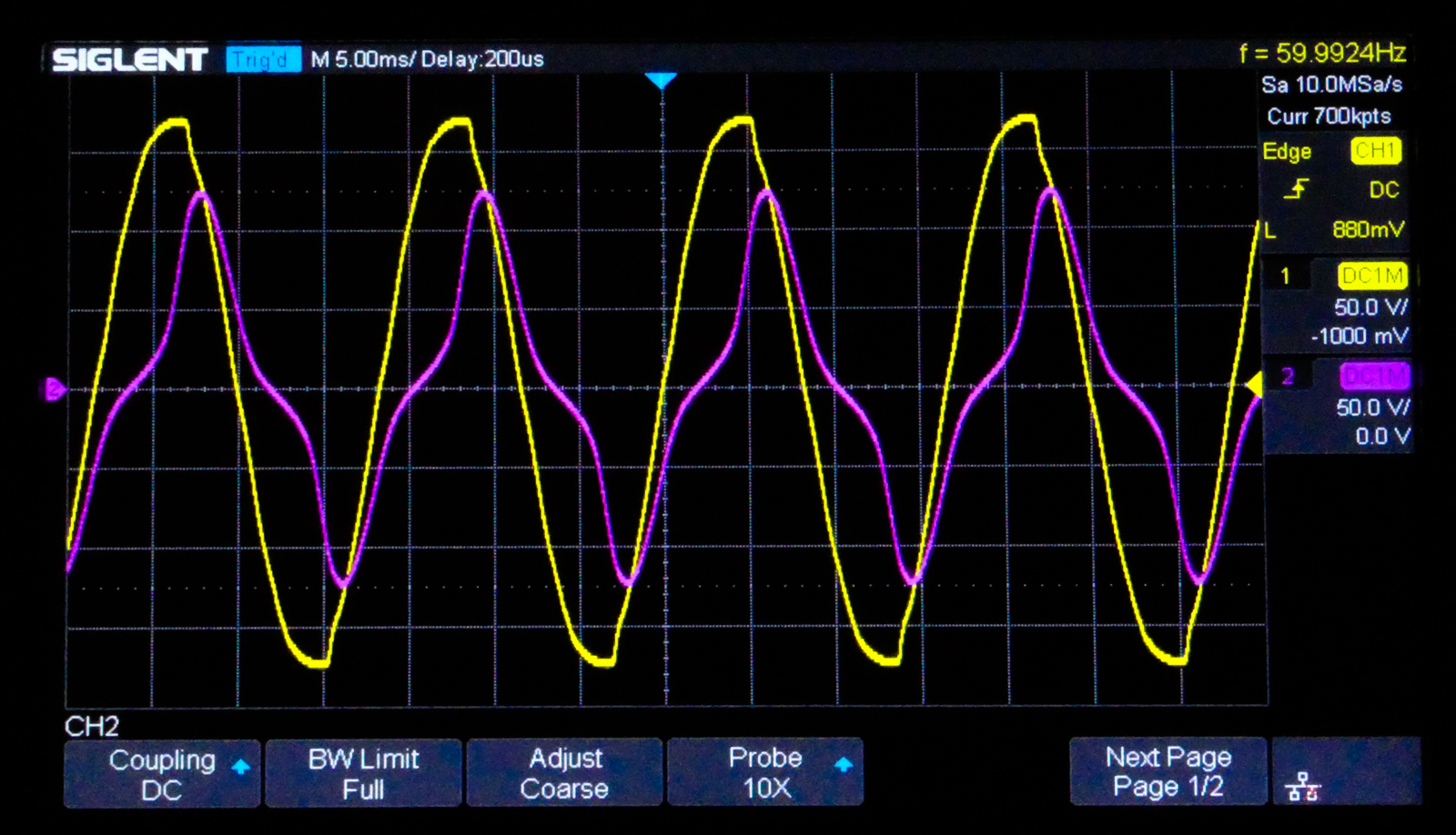
Magnetic amplifier output waveform (violet) at about 50% saturation. Input (yellow) is 120 VAC 60 Hz.

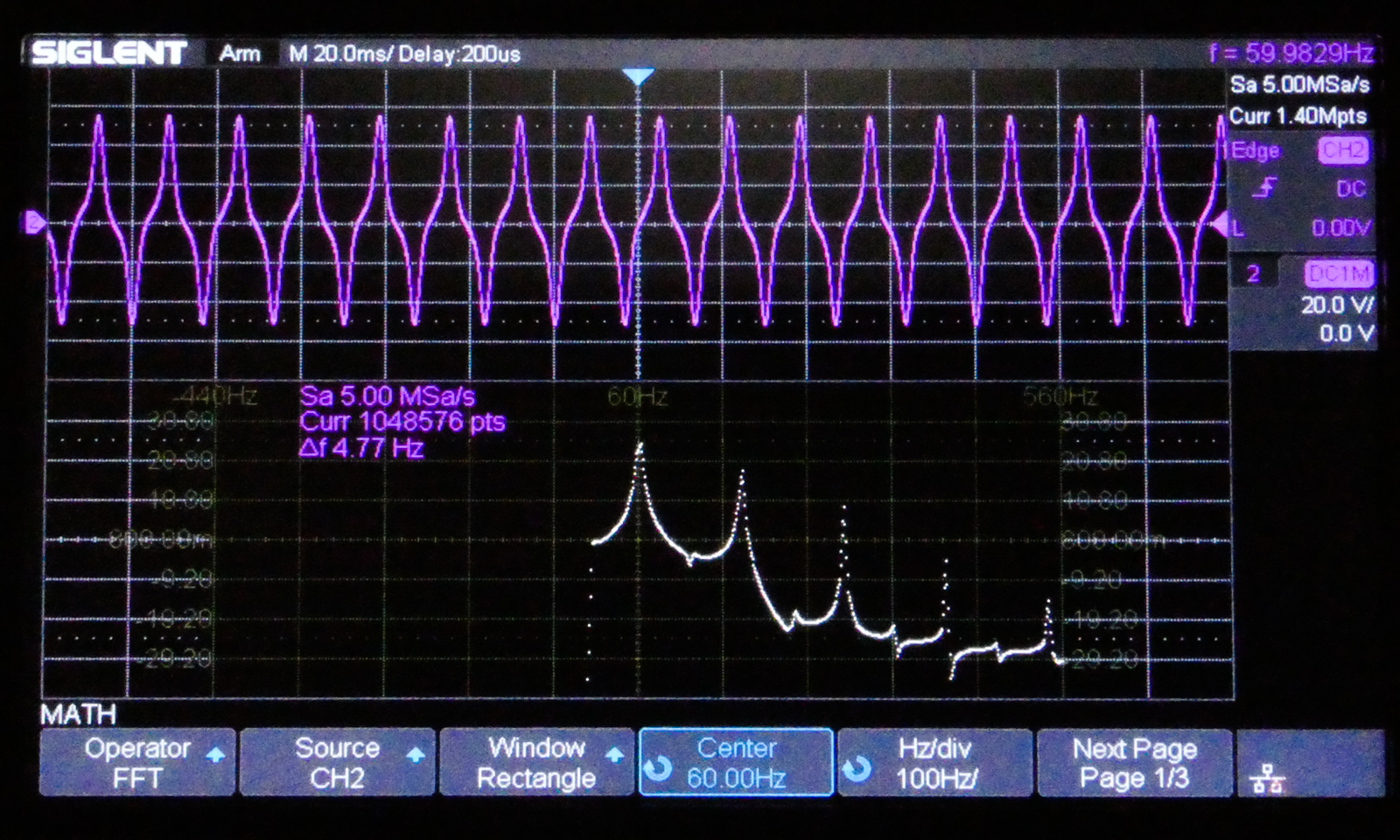
Magnetic amplifier output waveform frequency spectrum

Magnetic amplifiers introduce substantial harmonic distortion to the output waveform consisting entirely of the odd harmonics. Unlike the silicon controlled rectifiers or TRIACs which replaced them, the magnitude of these harmonics decreases rapidly with frequency so interference with nearby electronic devices such as radio receivers is uncommon.

== Applications ==
Magnetic amplifiers were important as modulation and control amplifiers in the early development of voice transmission by radio. A magnetic amplifier was used as voice modulator for a 2 kilowatt Alexanderson alternator, and magnetic amplifiers were used in the keying circuits of large high-frequency alternators used for radio communications. Magnetic amplifiers were also used to regulate the speed of Alexanderson alternators to maintain the accuracy of the transmitted radio frequency. Magnetic amplifiers were used to control large high-power alternators by turning them on and off for telegraphy or to vary the signal for voice modulation. The alternator's frequency limits were rather low to where a frequency multiplier had to be utilized to generate higher radio frequencies than the alternator was capable of producing. Even so, early magnetic amplifiers incorporating powdered-iron cores were incapable of producing radio frequencies above approximately 200 kHz. Other core materials, such as ferrite cores and oil-filled transformers, would have to be developed to allow the amplifier to produce higher frequencies.

The ability to control large currents with small control power made magnetic amplifiers useful for control of lighting circuits, for stage lighting and for advertising signs. Saturable reactor amplifiers were used for control of power to industrial furnaces. Magnetic amplifiers as variable AC voltage controllers have been mostly replaced by silicon controlled rectifiers or TRIACs. Magnetic amplifiers are still used in some arc welders.

Small magnetic amplifiers were used for radio tuning indicators, control of small motor and cooling fan speed, control of battery chargers.

Magnetic amplifiers were used extensively as the switching element in early switched-mode (SMPS) power supplies, as well as in lighting control. Semiconductor-based solid-state switches have largely superseded them, though recently there has been some regained interest in using mag amps in compact and reliable switching power supplies. PC ATX power supplies often use mag amps for secondary side voltage regulation. Cores designed specifically for switch mode power supplies are currently manufactured by several large electromagnetics companies, including Metglas and Mag-Inc.

Magnetic amplifiers were used by locomotives to detect wheel slip, until replaced by Hall effect current transducers. The cables from two traction motors passed through the core of the device. During normal operation the resultant flux was zero as both currents were the same and in opposite directions. The currents would differ during wheel slip, producing a resultant flux that acted as the Control winding, developing a voltage across a resistor in series with the AC winding which was sent to the wheel slip correction circuits.

Magnetic amplifiers can be used for measuring high DC-voltages without direct connection to the high voltage and are therefore still used in the HVDC-technique. The current to be measured is passed through the two cores, possibly by a solid bus bar. There is almost no voltage drop in this bus bar. The output signal, proportional to the ampere turns in the control current bus bar, is derived from the alternating excitation voltage of the magnetic amplifier, there is no voltage created or induced on the bus bar. The output signal has only a magnetic connection with the bus bar so the bus may be, quite safely, at any (EHT) voltage with respect to the instrumentation.

Instrumentation magnetic amplifiers are commonly found on space craft where a clean electromagnetic environment is highly desirable.

The German Kriegsmarine made extensive use of the magnetic amplifiers. They were used for the master stable element systems, for slow moving transmission for controlling guns, directors and rangefinders and train and elevation controls. Magnetic amplifiers were used in aircraft systems (avionics) before the advent of high reliability semiconductors. They were important in implementing early autoland systems and Concorde made use of the technology for the control of its engine air intakes before development of a system using digital electronics. Magnetic amplifiers were used in stabilizer controls of V2 rockets.

=== Usage in computing ===
Magnetic amplifiers were widely studied during the 1950s as a potential switching element for mainframe computers. Like transistors, mag amps were somewhat smaller than the typical vacuum tube, and had the significant advantage that they were not subject to "burning out" and thus had dramatically lower maintenance requirements. Another advantage is that a single mag amp could be used to sum several inputs in a single core, which was useful in the arithmetic logic unit (ALU) as it could greatly reduce the component count. Custom tubes could do the same, but transistors could not, so the mag amp was able to combine the advantages of tubes and transistors in an era when the latter were expensive and unreliable.

The principles of magnetic amplifiers were applied non linearly to create magnetic digital logic gates. That era was short, lasting from the mid-1950s to about 1960, when new fabrication techniques produced great improvements in transistors and dramatically lowered their cost. Only one large-scale mag amp machine was put into production, the UNIVAC Solid State, but a number of contemporary late-1950s/early-1960s computers used the technology, like the Ferranti Sirius, Ferranti Orion and the English Electric KDF9, or the one-off MAGSTEC.

== History ==
=== Early development ===
A voltage source and a series connected variable resistor may be regarded as a direct current signal source for a low resistance load such as the control coil of a saturable reactor which amplifies the signal. Thus, in principle, a saturable reactor is already an amplifier, although before 20th century they were used for simple tasks, such as controlling lighting and electrical machinery as early as 1885.

In 1904 radio pioneer Reginald Fessenden placed an order for a high frequency rotary mechanical alternator from the General Electric Company capable of generate AC at a frequency of 100 kHz to be used for continuous wave radio transmission over great distances. The design job was given to General Electric engineer Ernst F. Alexanderson who developed the 2 kW Alexanderson alternator. By 1916 Alexanderson added a magnetic amplifier to control the transmission of these rotary alternators for transoceanic radio communication.

The experimental telegraphy and telephony demonstrations made during 1917 attracted the attention of the US Government, especially in light of partial failures in the transoceanic cable across the Atlantic Ocean. The 50 kW alternator was commandeered by the US Navy and put into service in January 1918 and was used until 1920, when a 200 kW generator-alternator set was built and installed.

=== Usage in electric power generation ===
Magnetic amplifiers were extensively used in electricity power generation from the early 1960s onwards. They provided the small signal amplification for generator automatic voltage regulation (AVR) from a small error signal at milliwatt (mW) level to 100 kilowatt (kW) level. This was in turn converted by a rotating machine (exciter) to 5 megawatt (MW) level, the excitation power required by a typical 500 MW Power Plant Turbine Generator Unit. They proved durable and reliable. Many are recorded in service through the mid-1990s and some are still in use at older generating stations, notably in hydroelectric plants operating in northern California.

== Misnomer uses ==
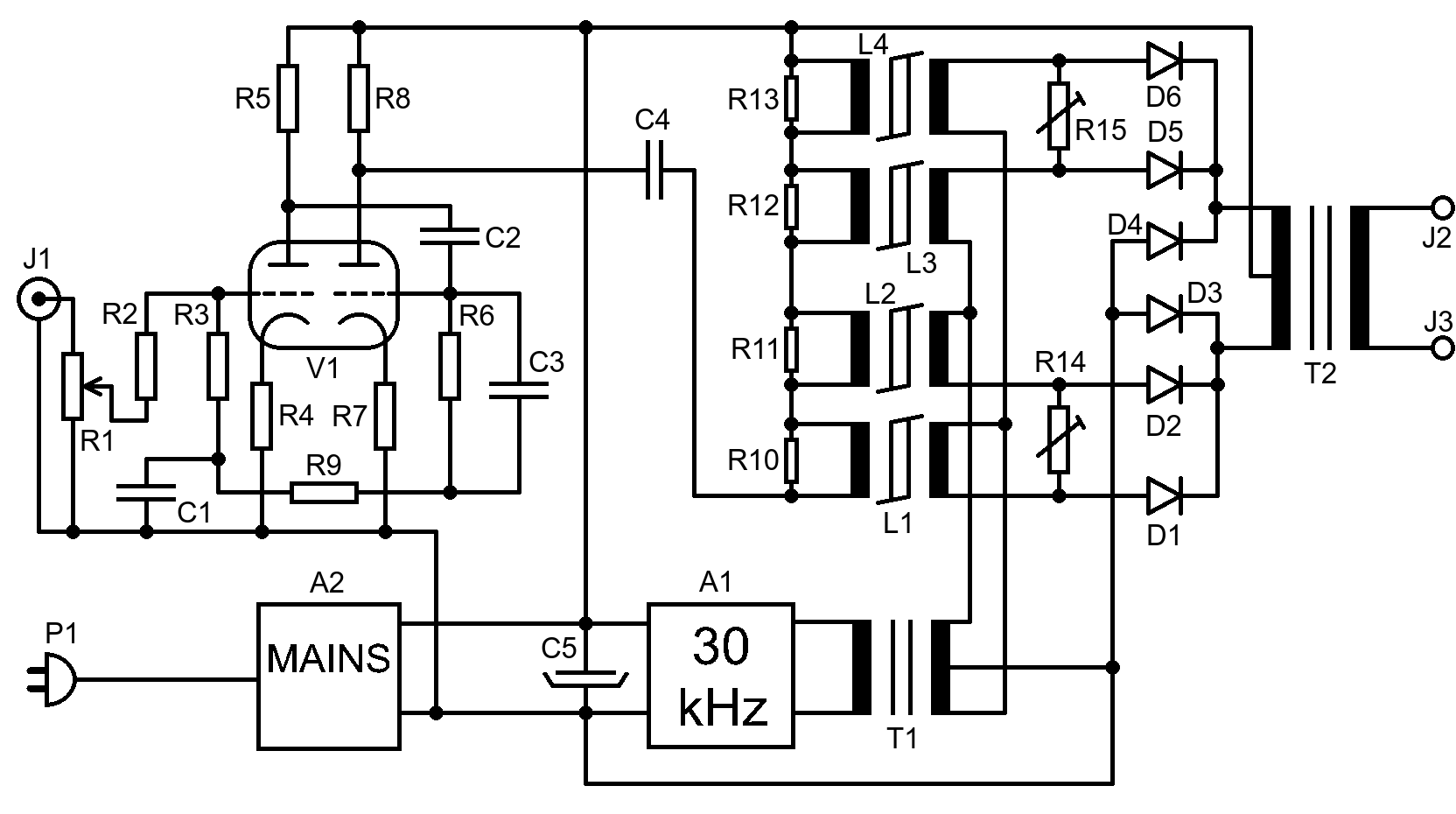
A real magnetic audio amplifier, designed by Swedish engineer Lars Lundahl, utilizes saturable reactors in its final power amplifying stage.

In the 1970s, Robert Carver designed and produced several high quality high-powered audio amplifiers, calling them magnetic amplifiers. In fact, they were in most respects conventional audio amplifier designs with unusual power supply circuits. They were not magnetic amplifiers as defined in this article. They should not be confused with real magnetic audio amplifiers.

== See also ==
- Parametron – Logic circuit element
- Magnetic logic – Digital logic based on non-linear magnetic effects
- Transductor – Type of magnetic amplifier
