= MAGSTEC =

MAGSTEC was a one-of-a-kind computer built by ERA for the US Navy. The machine was an experiment in using magnetic amplifiers for computer use. The US Air Force later contracted Univac, who had purchased ERA, to build the same basic architecture using transistors in place of the mag amps, creating TRANSTEC.
