= Indium(III) sulfate =

Names
- Other names Indium sulfate

Identifiers
| CAS Number | 13464-82-9; nonahydrate: 10294-68-5 |
| 3D model (JSmol) | Interactive image; nonahydrate: Interactive image |
| ChemSpider | 24258; nonahydrate: 27471862 |
| ECHA InfoCard | 100.033.340 |
| EC Number | 236-689-1 |
| PubChem CID | 26044; nonahydrate: 56845407 |
| RTECS number | NL1925000 |
| UNII | 514CE39CG4 |
| CompTox Dashboard (EPA) | DTXSID50890695 |
- InChI: InChI=1S/2In.3H2O4S/c;;3*1-5(2,3)4/h;;3*(H2,1,2,3,4)/q2*+3;;;/p-6 Key: XGCKLPDYTQRDTR-UHFFFAOYSA-H; InChI=1/2In.3H2O4S/c;;3*1-5(2,3)4/h;;3*(H2,1,2,3,4)/q2*+3;;;/p-6 Key: XGCKLPDYTQRDTR-CYFPFDDLAA; nonahydrate: InChI=1S/2In.3H2O4S.9H2O/c;;3*1-5(2,3)4;;;;;;;;;/h;;3*(H2,1,2,3,4);9*1H2/q2*+3;;;;;;;;;;;;/p-6 Key: OQUXYTSLMFRMIQ-UHFFFAOYSA-H
- SMILES: [In+3].[In+3].[O-]S(=O)(=O)[O-].[O-]S([O-])(=O)=O.[O-]S([O-])(=O)=O; nonahydrate: O.O.O.O.O.O.O.O.O.O=S(=O)([O-])[O-].O=S(=O)([O-])[O-].O=S(=O)([O-])[O-].[In+3].[In+3]

Properties
| Chemical formula | In_{2}(SO_{4})_{3} |
| Molar mass | 517.80 g·mol^{−1} |
| Appearance | white-gray odorless powder, hygroscopic, monoclinic crystals |
| Density | 3.44 g/cm^{3} |
| Melting point | 650 °C (1,202 °F; 923 K) decomposes |
| Solubility in water | 539.2 g/L at 20 °C (68 °F; 293 K) |

Structure
| Crystal structure | monoclinic (room temperature) |
| Space group | P12_{1} |
| Lattice constant | a = 8.57 Å, b = 8.908 Å, c = 14.66 Å α = 90°, β = 124.72°, γ = 90° |

Structure
| Crystal structure | rhombohedral |
| Space group | R-3 |
| Lattice constant | a = 8.44 Å, b = 8.44 Å, c = 23.093 Å α = 90°, β = 90°, γ = 120° |
| Coordination geometry | 6 formula per cell |

Thermochemistry
| Heat capacity (C) | 0.129 |

Hazards
- GHS labelling
| Pictograms | (GHS07: Exclamation mark) |
| Signal word | Warning |
| Hazard statements | H315, H319, H335 |
| Precautionary statements | P261, P264, P271, P280, P302+P352, P304+P340, P305+P351+P338, P312, P321, P332+P313, P337+P313, P362, P403+P233, P405, P501 |
| NFPA 704 (fire diamond) | 2 0 0 |
| Threshold limit value (TLV) | 0.1 mg/m^{3} (as In) (TWA), 0.3 mg/m^{3} (STEL) |
- NIOSH (US health exposure limits)
| PEL (Permissible) | 0.1 mg/m^{3} (as In) |
| Safety data sheet (SDS) | tttmetalpowder |
- Except where otherwise noted, data are given for materials in their standard state (at 25 °C [77 °F], 100 kPa). verify (what is ?) Infobox references

Indium(III) sulfate (In_{2}(SO_{4})_{3}) is a sulfate salt of the metal indium. It is a sesquisulfate, meaning that the sulfate group occurs 1 1/2 times as much as the metal. It may be formed by the reaction of indium, its oxide, or its carbonate with sulfuric acid. An excess of strong acid is required, otherwise insoluble basic salts are formed. As a solid indium sulfate can be anhydrous, or take the form of a pentahydrate with five water molecules or a nonahydrate with nine molecules of water. Indium sulfate is used in the production of indium or indium containing substances. Indium sulfate also can be found in basic salts, acidic salts or double salts including indium alum.

== Properties ==
In water solution, the indium ion forms a complex with water and sulfate, examples being In(H_{2}O)_{5}(SO_{4})^{+} and In(H_{2}O)_{4}(SO_{4})^{−}_{2}. Indium is unusual in forming a sulfate complex. The effect on the sulfate ion is revealed in the Raman spectrum. The proportion of sulfate complex increases with temperature showing the reaction that forms it is endothermic. The proportion also increases with concentration of the solution and can be over a half. The sulfate complex rapidly exchanges with water at a rate of over 10,000,000 per second, so that NMR cannot detect the difference that results from a complexed and noncomplexed indium ion. An indium sulfate water solution is quite acidic with a 0.14 mol/L solution having a pH of 1.85. If the pH rises above 3.4 then a precipitate will form.

The Raman spectrum of the solution shows lines at 650, 1000 and 1125 cm^{-1} due to a sulfur–oxygen bonds in sulfate bound to indium. A line at 255 cm^{-1} is due to the indium-oxygen bond to the sulfate. The water attached to the indium atom causes a band at about 400 cm^{-1}.

During extraction of indium, a sulfate solution of mixed metals, including indium sulfate, has trivalent metals partitioned into a kerosene solution of di-2-ethylhexyl hydrogen phosphate. Isododecylphosphetanic and diisooctylphosphinic acids can also be used for this function. The kerosene mixture is then backwashed with an acid to recover the metals in a water solution and regenerate the extracting fluid.

The heat capacity of anhydrous indium sulfate at standard conditions is 65.73 cal/deg/mole (1.651 J/g/deg). The heat capacity increases smoothly with temperature, indicating no crystal structure transitions.

== Production ==
Indium metal reacts with cold concentrated sulfuric acid to produce Indium sulfate and hydrogen gas. If hot concentrated sulfuric acid is used indium will reduce the sulfuric acid to sulfur dioxide.

Indium sulfate can also be produced from a reaction of sulfuric acid on indium oxide, indium carbonate, or indium hydroxide.

== Reactions ==
When heated to 710 K (437 °C; 818 °F) or above, indium sulfate decomposes by giving off sulfur trioxide vapour, yielding indium oxide.

In_{2}(SO_{4})_{3} → In_{2}O_{3} + 3 SO_{3}↑

Alkalis added to indium sulfate solutions precipitate basic salts. For example, potassium hydroxide produces either a basic sulfate, 2In_{2}O_{3}·SO_{3}·nH_{2}O, or KIn_{3}(OH)_{6}(SO_{4})_{2} depending on pH. Sodium pyrophosphate causes a slimy precipitate of indium pyrophosphate, In_{4}(P_{2}O_{7})_{3}·3H_{2}O. Potassium periodate causes a precipitate of a basic indium periodate, 2InO_{5}·In(OH)_{3}·6H_{2}O. Oxalic acid causes a precipitate of indium oxalate, In_{2}(C_{2}O_{4})_{3}·10H_{2}O. Alkali oxalates cause a precipitate of the alkali dioxalatoindate to form MIn(C_{2}O_{4})_{2}·3H_{2}O, where M = Na, K or NH_{4}.

== Related compounds ==
=== Hydrogen sulfates ===
An acid sulfate, indium hydrogensulfate tetrahydrate with the formula HIn(SO_{4})_{2}·4H_{2}O crystallises in the orthorhombic system with unit cell dimensions a = 9.997 Å, b = 5.477 Å, c = 18.44 Å, with four of the formula per cell. The density is 2.50 g/cm^{3}. In the acid sulfate, two water molecules are linked to the indium atom and a hydronium ion H_{5}O_{2} takes care of the proton. This is part of an acid sulfate family that includes Al, Ga, In, Tl(III), Fe(III) and Ti(III). HIn(SO_{4})_{2} is made by evaporating an indium sulfate in 40% sulfuric acid solution or cooling indium sulfate in a 60% sulfuric acid solution. As the acid tetrahydrate is heated it gives off water yielding a trihydrate, monohydrate, and an anhydrous form at 370 K (97 °C; 206 °F), 385 K (112 °C; 233 °F) and 482 K (209 °C; 408 °F). Above 505 K (232 °C; 449 °F) it gives out more water and sulfur dioxide yielding the neutral indium sulfate. Indium hydrogensulfate is a proton conductor with conductivity 0.0002 Ω^{-1}cm^{-1}.

=== Basic sulfates ===
A basic indium sulfate is made by adding ethanol to a water solution of indium sulfate. Crystals can be formed by using a 0.05 molar solution with twice the volume of ethanol, and waiting for several weeks for crystals to form. InOHSO_{4}·(H_{2}O)_{2} has monoclinic crystals with a=6.06 Å b=7.89 Å c=12.66 Å and β=107.5°. Cell volume is 577.6 Å^{3}. Another basic indium sulfate InOHSO_{4} with rhombohedral crystals is made by heating an indium sulfate solution at 160 °C (320 °F) or over for about a week in a sealed tube. This insoluble basic salt also forms if indium sulfate solution is diluted below 0.005 molar. So a precipitate forms from diluted solutions as well as from heated solutions.

=== Anhydrous double sulfates ===
Two different types of anhydrous double indium sulfates have been made. One is from the family M^{I}_{3}M^{III}(XO_{4})_{3}, with M^{I} being a large singly positive ion such as K, Rb, Cs, Tl or NH_{3}; M^{III} is triply charged and can be Al, Ga, In, Tl, V, Cr, Fe, Sc and other rare earths; and X is S or Se. Most of these have a rhombohedral crystal structure. However, triammonium indium trisulfate, (NH_{4})_{3}In(SO_{4})_{3} converts from rhombohedral to monoclinic as the temperature drops below 80 °C (176 °F), and converts back into a rhombohedral form with space group R3c as the temperature rises above 110 °C (230 °F). The low temperature monoclinic form has space group P2_{1}/c, a=8.96 Å, b=15.64 Å c=9.13 Å β=108.28° Z=4 The high temperature form is termed "β-". An explanation for this transition is that ammonium (and also thallium) is a non-spherical ion and thus has lower symmetry. However, when it is heated enough, dynamical disorder causing random orientations makes the ions on average spherically symmetric. Alkali metal ions are spherical in shape at all temperatures and form rhombohedral structures. Double sulfates of this form exist of indium with the alkali metals sodium, potassium, rubidium, and cesium. These can be formed by heating a solid mixture of the individual sulfates to 350 °C (662 °F).

| name | formula | molecular weight | a Å | c Å | α | volume Å^{3} | density |
|---|---|---|---|---|---|---|---|
| trisodium indium trisulfate | Na_{3}In(SO_{4})_{3} | 471.97 | 13.970 | 8.771 | 109° | 494 | 3.172 |
| tripotassium indium trisulfate | K_{3}In(SO_{4})_{3} | 520.30 | 14.862 | 8.960 | 109.75° | 571 | 3.026 |
| trirubidium indium trisulfate | Rb_{3}In(SO_{4})_{3} | 659.41 | 15.413 | 9.136 | 110.05° | 626 | 3.498 |
| tricesium indium trisulfate | Cs_{3}In(SO_{4})_{3} | 801.72 | 16.068 | 9.211 | 110.6° | 687 | 3.876 |
| triammonium indium trisulfate | (NH_{4})_{3}In(SO_{4})_{3} | 361.06 | 15.531 | 9.163 | 120° | 1914.1 | 1.88 |
| ammonium indium disulfate | NH_{4}In(SO_{4})_{2} | 324.98 | 4.902 | 8.703 | 73.643° | 171.27 | 3.15 |
| rubidium indium disulfate | RbIn(SO_{4})_{2} | 392.41 | 4.908 | 8.7862 | 73.781° | 173.50 | 3.75 |
| cesium indium disulfate | CsIn(SO_{4})_{2} | 439.85 | 4.956 | 9.2567 | 74.473° | 187.26 | 3.90 |
| thallium indium disulfate | TlIn(SO_{4})_{2} | 511.33 | 4.919 | 8.7882 | 73.748° | 174.27 | 4.87 |

Another series of anhydrous rhombohedral double salts in the same series of TlFe(SO_{4})_{2} exists. These can be made by heating a mixture of anhydrous sulfates at 350 °C (662 °F), or by dehydrating hydrous double alum type salts at 300 °C (572 °F). The substances in this series are RbIn(SO_{4})_{2}, CsIn(SO_{4})_{2}, TlIn(SO_{4})_{2} and NH_{4}In(SO_{4})_{2}. Although KIn(SO_{4})_{2} exists it has a different crystalline form.

=== Hydrated double sulfates ===
Hydrated double salts of indium in an alum structure exist with formula M^{I}In(SO_{4})_{2}·12H_{2}O. All alums have a cubic crystal structure with space group Pa3. The indium cesium alum CsIn(SO_{4})_{2}·12H_{2}O has molecular weight 656.0, unit cell width 12.54 Å, cell volume 1972 Å^{3} and density 2.20 g/cm^{3}. It has the β alum structure. The cesium alum can be used in the analysis of indium. It precipitates when cesium nitrate is added to indium sulfate solution with extra sulfuric acid added.

Indium ammonium alum NH_{4}In(SO_{4})_{2}·12H_{2}O is fairly unstable at room temperature and must be crystallised below 5 °C (41 °F). It decomposes at 36 °C (97 °F) to a tetrahydrate. It changes to a ferroelectric phase below 127 K (−146 °C; −231 °F). The alum methyl ammonium indium sulfate dodecahydrate CH_{3}NH_{3}In(SO_{4})_{2}·12H_{2}O becomes ferroelectric below 164 K (−109 °C; −164 °F). Potassium indium alum has not been crystallised. Rubidum indium alum is highly efflorescent very easily losing its water.

Another series of monoclinic hydrated double salts have four water molecules MIn(SO_{4})_{2}·4H_{2}O, with five formulae per unit cell, where M is NH_{4}, K or Rb and the point group is P2_{1}/c. The prototype substance for the series is (NH_{4})In(SO_{4})_{2}·4H_{2}O.

| formula | weight | a Å | b Å | c Å | β | volume Å^{3} | density | ref |
|---|---|---|---|---|---|---|---|---|
| NH_{4}In(SO_{4})_{2}·4H_{2}O | 397.04 | 10.651 | 10.745 | 9.279 | 102.67° | 1036.08 | 3.182 | |
| KIn(SO_{4})_{2}·4H_{2}O | 418.10 | 10.581 | 10.641 | 9.224 | 101.93° | 1016.1 | 3.416 | |
| RbIn(SO_{4})_{2}·4H_{2}O | 464.47 | 10.651 | 10.745 | 9.279 | 102.67° | 1036.1 | 3.722 | |

Cadmium can also form a double sulfate, Cd_{3}In_{2}(SO_{4})_{6}·26H_{2}O.

Crystals with less water also exist like KIn(SO_{4})_{2}·H_{2}O.

=== Organic double sulfates ===
Organic base double sulfates of indium include the guanidinium salt [C(NH_{2})_{3}][In(H_{2}O)_{2}(SO_{4})_{2}], which crystallises in a monoclinic system with space group P2_{1}/c a = 4.769 Å, b = 20.416 Å, c = 10.445 Å, β = 93.39°, cell volume 1015.3 Å^{3}, 4 formulas per cell and density 2.637 g/cm^{3}. [H_{2}(4,4'-bi-py)][In_{2}(H_{2}O)_{6}(SO_{4})_{4}]·2H_{2}O crystallises in the triclinic system with a = 7.143 Å, b = 7.798 Å, c = 12.580 Å, α = 107.61°, β = 98.79°, γ = 93.89°, cell volume 655.2 Å^{3}, one formula per cell and density 2.322 g/cm^{3}. [H(2,2'-bipy)][In(H_{2}O)(SO_{4})_{2}]·2H_{2}O, the hexamethylenediamine salt [H_{3}N(CH_{2})_{6}NH_{3}][In(H_{2}O)_{2}(SO_{4})_{2}]_{2}·2H_{2}O and [H_{2}(Py(CH_{2})_{3}Py)][In(H_{2}O)_{2}(SO_{4})_{2}]_{2}·2H_{2}O also exist. Yet other organic derivatives include those of triethylenetetramine, and amylammonium. Tri-μ-sulfato-κ^{6}O:O'-bis[aqua(1,10-phenanthroline-κ^{2}N,N')indium(III)] dihydrate, [In_{2}(SO_{4})_{3}(C_{12}H_{8}N_{2})_{2}(H_{2}O)_{2}]·2H_{2}O, has a 1,10-phenanthroline molecule linked to each indium ion. Two indium ions are linked via three sulfate groups. It forms triclinic crystals with two formulas per unit cell. The density is 2.097 g/cm^{3}.

Dimethylindium sulfate [(CH_{3})_{2}In]_{2}SO_{4} can be made by reacting trimethylindium with dry sulfuric acid.

=== Mixed ===
A double indium sulfate chloride salt has formula In_{2}(SO_{4})_{3}·InCl_{3}·nH_{2}O where n = 17±1.

=== Monovalent ===
Indium(I) sulfate, In_{2}SO_{4} can be made in a solid state by heating indium metal with indium(III) sulfate, but when dissolving in water or sulfuric acid, In^{+} reacts to produce hydrogen gas. The mixed valence salt In^{I}In^{III}(SO_{4})_{2} is also made by heating indium metal with indium(III) sulfate.

== Use ==
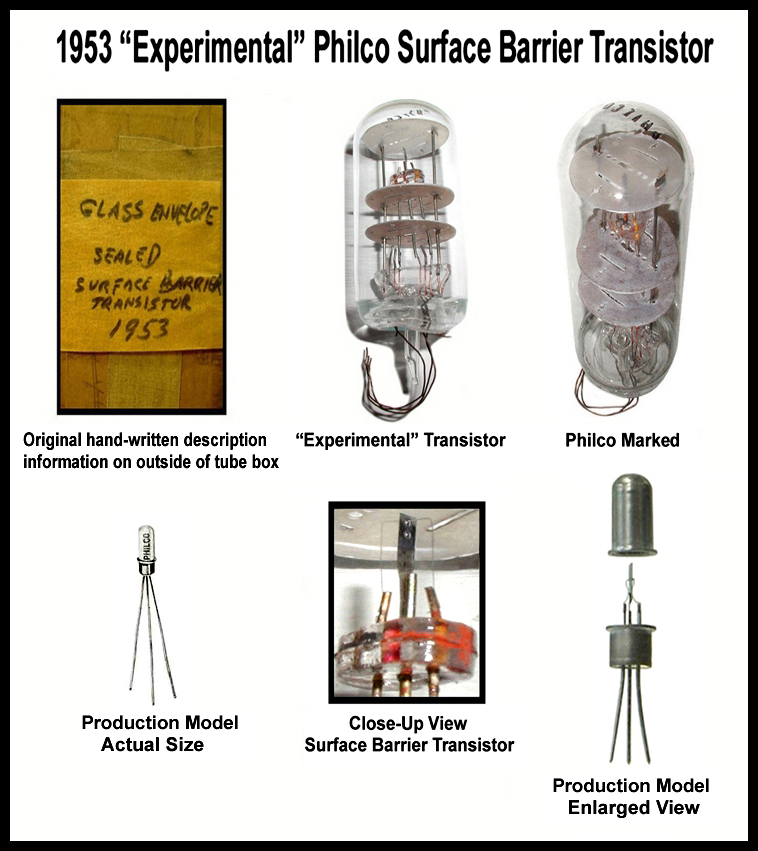
Philco surface-barrier transistor developed and produced in 1953

Indium sulfate is a commercially available chemical. It can be used to electroplate indium metal, as a hardening agent in gold electroplating or to prepare other indium containing substances such as copper indium selenide. It has been sold as a health supplement, even though there is no evidence of benefit to humans, and it is toxic.

The first high-frequency transistor was the surface-barrier germanium transistor developed by Philco in 1953, capable of operating up to 60 MHz. These were made by etching depressions into an N-type germanium base from both sides with jets of indium sulfate until it was a few ten-thousandths of an inch thick. Indium electroplated into the depressions formed the collector and emitter.
