= Aluminium triacetate =

Names
- IUPAC name Aluminium acetate
- Other names Aluminium(III) acetate

Identifiers
CAS Number	139-12-8
3D model (JSmol)	Interactive image
ChEMBL	ChEMBL1201015
ChemSpider	8427
DrugBank	DB14518
ECHA InfoCard	100.004.868
EC Number	205-354-1
PubChem CID	8757
UNII	80EHD8I43D
CompTox Dashboard (EPA)	DTXSID30890496
- InChI: InChI=1S/3C2H4O2.Al/c3*1-2(3)4;/h3*1H3,(H,3,4);/q;;;+3/p-3 Key: WCOATMADISNSBV-UHFFFAOYSA-K
- SMILES: CC(=O)[O-].CC(=O)[O-].CC(=O)[O-].[Al+3]

Properties
Chemical formula	C_{6}H_{9}AlO_{6}
Molar mass	204.114 g·mol^{−1}
Appearance	white solid
Solubility in water	soluble

Related compounds
Related compounds	Basic aluminium diacetate (hydroxyaluminium diacetate), CAS RN 142-03-0, HOAl(CH_{3}CO_{2})_{2} Dibasic aluminium monoacetate (dihydroxyaluminium acetate), CAS RN 7360-44-3, (HO)_{2}AlCH_{3}CO_{2}
- Except where otherwise noted, data are given for materials in their standard state (at 25 °C [77 °F], 100 kPa). Infobox references

Aluminium triacetate, formally named aluminium acetate, is a chemical compound with composition Al(CH_{3}CO_{2})_{3}. Under standard conditions it appears as a white, water-soluble solid that decomposes on heating at around 200 °C. The triacetate hydrolyses to a mixture of basic hydroxide / acetate salts, and multiple species co-exist in chemical equilibrium, particularly in aqueous solutions of the acetate ion; the name aluminium acetate is commonly used for this mixed system.

It has therapeutic applications for its anti-itching, astringent, and antiseptic properties, and, as an over-the-counter preparation like Burow's solution, it is used to treat ear infections. Burow's solution preparations have been diluted and modified with amino acids to make them more palatable for use as gargles for conditions like aphthous ulcers of the mouth. In veterinary medicine, aluminium triacetate's astringency property is used for treating Mortellaro disease in hoofed animals such as cattle.

Aluminium triacetate is used as a mordant agent with dyes like alizarin, both alone and in combination. Together with aluminium diacetate or with aluminium sulfacetate it is used with cotton, other cellulose fibres, and silk. It has also been combined with ferrous acetate to produce different colours.

== Nomenclature ==
According to the formal rules for naming inorganic compounds, the name for Al(CH_{3}CO_{2})_{3} is aluminium acetate, though more formal names like aluminium(III) acetate and aluminium ethanoate are acceptable. The use of the "tri" multiplying prefix in the name aluminium triacetate, while not technically required, is regularly used to avoid potential confusion with related compounds with hydroxo ligands. Basic aluminium diacetate, formally hydroxyaluminium diacetate (CAS RN 142-03-0), has composition HOAl(CH_{3}CO_{2})_{2} with one hydroxo ligand in place of an acetate ligand, and dibasic aluminium monoacetate, formally dihydroxyaluminium acetate (CAS RN 7360-44-3), has composition (HO)_{2}AlCH_{3}CO_{2} with only one acetate ligand. These three compounds are distinct in the solid phase but are usually treated as a group and described collectively as aluminium acetate in solution, due to the triacetate hydrolyzing to a mixture which includes the other two forms. The abbreviation as AlAc, along with variants like AlAc^{2+} and AlAc^{+}_{2}, are sometimes used in the discipline of geochemistry, though these are inconsistent with standard practice in mainstream chemistry.^{[a]}

== Structure ==
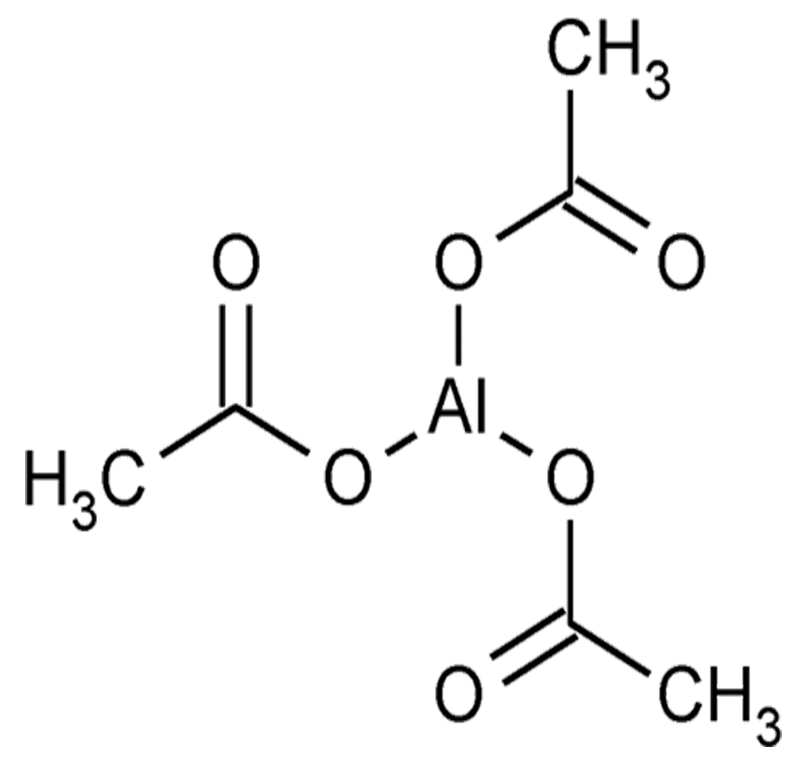
Representations of Al(CH_{3}CO_{2})_{3} with ionic (left) and covalent molecular (right) motifs

The formula Al(CH_{3}CO_{2})_{3} indicates the presence of aluminium centres in the +3 oxidation state and acetate groups in a ratio of 1:3. Images used to represent this substance, such as those shown at left, represent two highly oversimplified approximations of the solid-state structure: the first is as a purely ionic salt with a single aluminium(III) cation (Al^{3+}) surrounded by and associated electrostatically with three acetate anions (CH_{3}CO^{−}_{2}), but this should not be taken to convey information about the crystal structure. For example, sodium chloride (NaCl) has a cation-to-anion stoichiometry of 1:1, but it has a cubic structure with each ion surrounded octahedrally by six ions of the opposite charge.

The other image is a molecular form with the three acetate groups covalently bonded to the metal centre in a trigonal planar geometry and intermolecular interactions holding the molecules together with each other in the crystal structure. It is highly likely that the solid state structure is more complicated and includes both covalent and ionic characteristics and it is possible that multiple aluminium centres and / or bridging acetate groups might be present – both of these have been reported in aluminium acetate solution and aluminium chloride is known to exist as a Al_{2}Cl_{6} dimer.

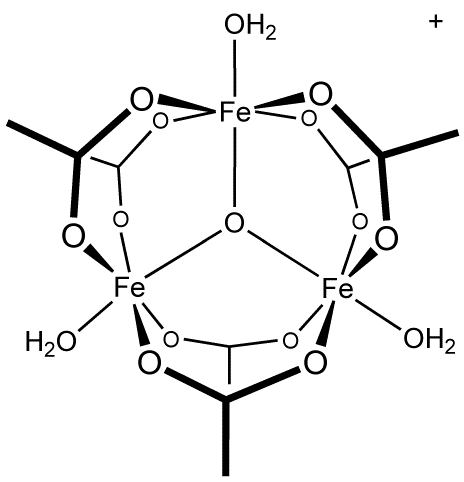
[Fe_{3}(μ_{3}–O)(OAc)_{6}(H_{2}O)_{3}]^{+}, the cation found in iron(III) acetate

NMR investigations of the aqueous aluminium(III) / acetate system show the presence of aluminium as a hexaaqua complex, [Al(H_{2}O)_{6}]^{3+}, as well as mononuclear species with different substitutions. In addition, the investigations demonstrate that a significant solution-phase species is an Al_{13} tridecamer, a moiety reported in conflicting mechanisms of hydrolysis and polymerisation aluminium solutions. Other trivalent metal cations are known to form polynuclear species: iron(III) acetate, for example, forms a trinuclear structure with a triply-bridged oxo centre with the cation [Fe_{3}(μ_{3}–O)(OAc)_{6}(H_{2}O)_{3}]^{+}. The compound chromium acetate hydroxide, Cr_{3}(OH)_{2}(OAc)_{7}, has also been described as isostructural. Analogous ruthenium(III), vanadium(III), rhodium(III), and iridium(III) compounds with trinuclear structures are known. Copper(II) acetate and chromium(II) acetate both have dinuclear dihydrate structures, M_{2}(OAc)_{4}(H_{2}O)_{2}, as does rhodium(II) acetate; each shows significant metal-metal bonding interactions.

== Chemistry ==
=== Preparation ===
According to the CRC Handbook of Inorganic Compounds, aluminium triacetate is a white, water-soluble solid and is usually prepared from aluminium chloride or directly from aluminium by heating in an acetic acid solution with acetic anhydride.

3 CH_{3}COOH + AlCl_{3} → Al(CH_{3}CO_{2})_{3} + 3 HCl

6 CH_{3}COOH + 2 Al → 2 Al(CH_{3}CO_{2})_{3} + 3 H_{2}

Theoretically all of the aluminium / acetate / hydroxide salts can be prepared from aluminium hydroxide or sodium aluminate and acetic acid, but formation of the triacetate only occurs in the absence of water. In solutions, the diacetate is the major product formed, and is also produced when aluminium chloride is treated with a sodium acetate solution in basic conditions. The equations for these processes are:

2 CH_{3}CO_{2}Na + Al(OH)_{3} → Al(CH_{3}CO_{2})_{2}OH + 2 NaOH

2 CH_{3}CO_{2}Na + AlCl_{3} + NaOH → Al(CH_{3}CO_{2})_{2}OH + 3 NaCl

2 CH_{3}CO_{2}Na + NaAlO_{2} + 2 H_{2}O → Al(CH_{3}CO_{2})_{2}OH + 3 NaOH

An improved process using a combination of aluminium chloride and sodium aluminate with sodium acetate prepared in situ has been patented:

29 NaAlO_{2} + 10 NaOH + 84 CH_{3}COOH + 13 AlCl_{3} → 42 Al(CH_{3}CO_{2})_{2}OH + 39 NaCl + 26 H_{2}O

The mordants aluminium triacetate and aluminium sulfacetate can be prepared from aluminium sulfate, the product formed being determined by the amount of lead(II) acetate used:

Al_{2}(SO_{4})_{3} + 3 Pb(CH_{3}CO_{2})_{2} → 2 Al(CH_{3}CO_{2})_{3} + 3 PbSO_{4}

Al_{2}(SO_{4})_{3} + 2 Pb(CH_{3}CO_{2})_{2} → Al_{2}SO_{4}(CH_{3}CO_{2})_{4} + 2 PbSO_{4}

=== Decomposition ===
On heating, aluminium triacetate decomposes above 200 °C in a process similar to that of aluminium formate. The process begins with loss of acetic anhydride (Ac_{2}O) between 120 and 140 °C to form a mixture of the basic oxide acetates such as Al_{2}O(CH_{3}CO_{2})_{4} and Al_{3}O(CH_{3}CO_{2})_{7}, which are ultimately transformed to Al_{2}O_{3} (alumina), first as an amorphous anhydrous solid and then through other solid phases (γ-, δ-, and θ- crystal forms) to ultimately become polymorphic α-Al_{2}O_{3}:

2 Al(CH_{3}CO_{2})_{3} → Al_{2}O(CH_{3}CO_{2})_{4} + CH_{3}CO(O)COCH_{3} → Al_{2}O_{3} + 3 CH_{3}CO(O)COCH_{3}

2 Al(CH_{3}CO_{2})_{2}OH → Al_{2}O_{3} + 2 CH_{3}COOH + CH_{3}CO(O)COCH_{3}

=== Hydrolysis ===
Aluminium triacetate hydrolyses to produce both the mono- and di-basic hydroxide acetates in solution or by hygroscopy:

Al(CH_{3}CO_{2})_{3} + H_{2}O → Al(CH_{3}CO_{2})_{2}OH + CH_{3}COOH

Al(CH_{3}CO_{2})_{3} + 2 H_{2}O → Al(CH_{3}CO_{2})(OH)_{2} + 2 CH_{3}COOH

== Uses ==
According to the National Cancer Institute, the aluminium acetates are used topically in humans as antiseptic agents, which also cause body tissues to shrink. Its astringency property is also used for treating Mortellaro disease in hoofed animals such as cattle. Aluminium acetate promotes healing of infected skin and also assists with inflammation, itching, and stinging. The Food and Drug Administration has approved it for use for "temporary relief of minor skin irritations due to ... 'poison ivy,' 'poison oak,' 'poison sumac,' 'insect bites,' 'athlete's foot,' or 'rashes caused by soaps, detergents, cosmetics, or jewelry.'" For these applications, over-the-counter preparations such as Burow's solution are typically used, while diluted forms are used as gargles for conditions like aphthous ulcers of the mouth, including with amino acid additives to improve palatability and taste. The most common use of Burow's solution is in treating ear infections including otomycosis, though it is generally not as effective as clotrimazole in these fungal infections. Topical astringent powder Domeboro contains aluminium sulfate tetradecahydrate, [Al(H_{2}O)_{6}]_{2}(SO_{4})_{3}•2H_{2}O, and calcium acetate monohydrate, Ca(CH_{3}CO_{2})_{2}•H_{2}O, and forms an aluminium acetate solution similar to Burow's solution when dissolved. Domeboro solutions in warm water can be used in cases of ingrown toenails, to reduce irritation and contain any infection which might be present.

=== Mordant ===
Kiel and Heertjes' structure for the anion of Ca[Al(H_{2}O)(OH)Az_{2}]•2H_{2}O, which alizarin forms with an aluminium mordant

A mordant is a substance used to set dyes on fabrics or tissue sections by forming a coordination complex with the dye, which subsequently attaches to the fabric or tissue. A mordant often contains a polyvalent metal ion, commonly aluminium or iron, as is the case with mixtures of aluminium triacetate with aluminium sulfacetate or with basic aluminium diacetate. Aluminium triacetate mordants have been used with cotton, other cellulose-based fibres, and silk. They have also been combined with ferrous acetate to produce different colours.

Wunderlich and Bergerhoff's structure for alizarin bound to an aluminium mordant as CaAz_{2}Al(μ-OH)_{2}AlAz_{2}Ca

In the case of the dye alizarin (1,2-dihydroxyanthraquinone, H_{2}Az), mordanting was hypothesised to involve the formation of a dianion of alizarin. This would form a five-coordinate aluminium complex, CaAl(OH)Az_{2}, which can take up water to form a hydrate with a six-coordinate aluminium-centred dianion, Ca[Al(H_{2}O)(OH)Az_{2}]•2H_{2}O. The proposal was based on infrared spectroscopic data, and was subsequently challenged by work suggesting a structure with two bridging hydroxyl ligands connecting a dinuclear core, Az_{2}Al(μ-OH)_{2}AlAz^{4−}_{2}, with two alizarin moieties each chelating to each aluminium centre. The structure was proposed by Soubayrol et al. based on ^{27}Al NMR spectroscopy and electrospray ionisation mass spectrometry evidence. They reported that the degree of hydration was dependent on the identity of the counter-ion, with the sodium salt being a stable tetrahydrate with a monohydrate being formed from potassium hydroxide. These were distinguishable based on their chemical shifts, suggesting the waters are associating with the aluminium centres or the alizarin moieties, and not behaving as is typical for waters of crystallisation.

A related structure with calcium ions was reported in 1994, and in it the alizarins chelate to the calcium ions to form AzCaAz bridges between the aluminium centres (which are also bridged by hydroxo groups) and the aluminium centres subsequently bind to the deprotonated phenol residues of the dye; in the Soubayrol model, each alizarin is associated with a single aluminium cation. As with the structure of aluminium acetate itself, the forms it takes in applications has not been resolved.

== Notes ==
^{a} This "Ac" is not referring to the element actinium. Used in this way, the convention in organic chemistry is for Ac to refer to the acetyl group, the radical form of which is CH_{3}CO, and OAc or AcO would be used for the acetate radical, CH_{3}CO_{2}, sometimes also called "acetoxy." The acetate ion would then be AcO^{−}, CH_{3}CO^{−}_{2}, and acetic acid would be AcOH or HOAc. Under this convention, aluminium triacetate would be Al(OAc)_{3}. Publications in geochemistry, however, are using Ac to refer to acetate rather than acetyl and thus AlAc^{+}_{2} in geochemistry would be written under more usual chemistry conventions as [Al(OAc)_{2}]^{+} or [Al(CH_{3}CO_{2})_{2}]^{+}.
