= Ebony =

Type of dense black/brown hardwood

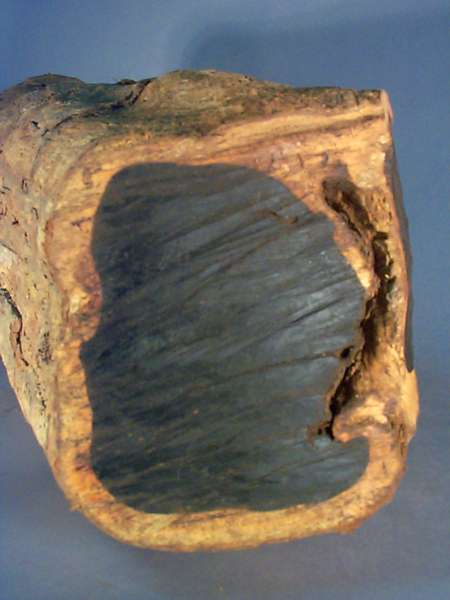
Cross-section of an unprocessed piece of ebony wood

Ebony is a dense black–brown hardwood, coming from several species in the genus Diospyros, which also includes the persimmon. A few Diospyros species, such as macassar and mun ebony, are dense enough to sink in water. Ebony is finely textured and has a mirror finish when polished, making it valuable as an ornamental wood. It is often cited as one of the most expensive woods in the world.

It has been severely overharvested, and is subject to significant poaching. The import and export of ebony wood is regulated by international treaty and is illegal in some countries. Sustainable modern alternatives to ebony have been developed, such as ebonising, using black plastic, or other black woods.

== Etymology ==
The word ebony comes from the Ancient Egyptian hbny, through the Ancient Greek ἔβενος (ébenos), into Latin (ebenus) and Middle English.

== Species ==
Species of ebony include Diospyros ebenum (Ceylon ebony), native to southern India and Sri Lanka; D. crassiflora (Gabon ebony), native to western Africa; Diospyros blancoi (Philippine ebony, also known as kamagong); D. humilis (Queensland ebony), native to Queensland, the Northern Territory, New Guinea and Timor; and D. celebica (Sulawesi ebony), native to Indonesia and prized for its luxuriant, multi-colored wood grain. Mauritius ebony, D. tessellaria, was largely exploited by the Dutch in the 17th century. Some species in the genus yield an ebony with similar physical properties, but striped rather than the even black of D. ebenum.

== Uses ==
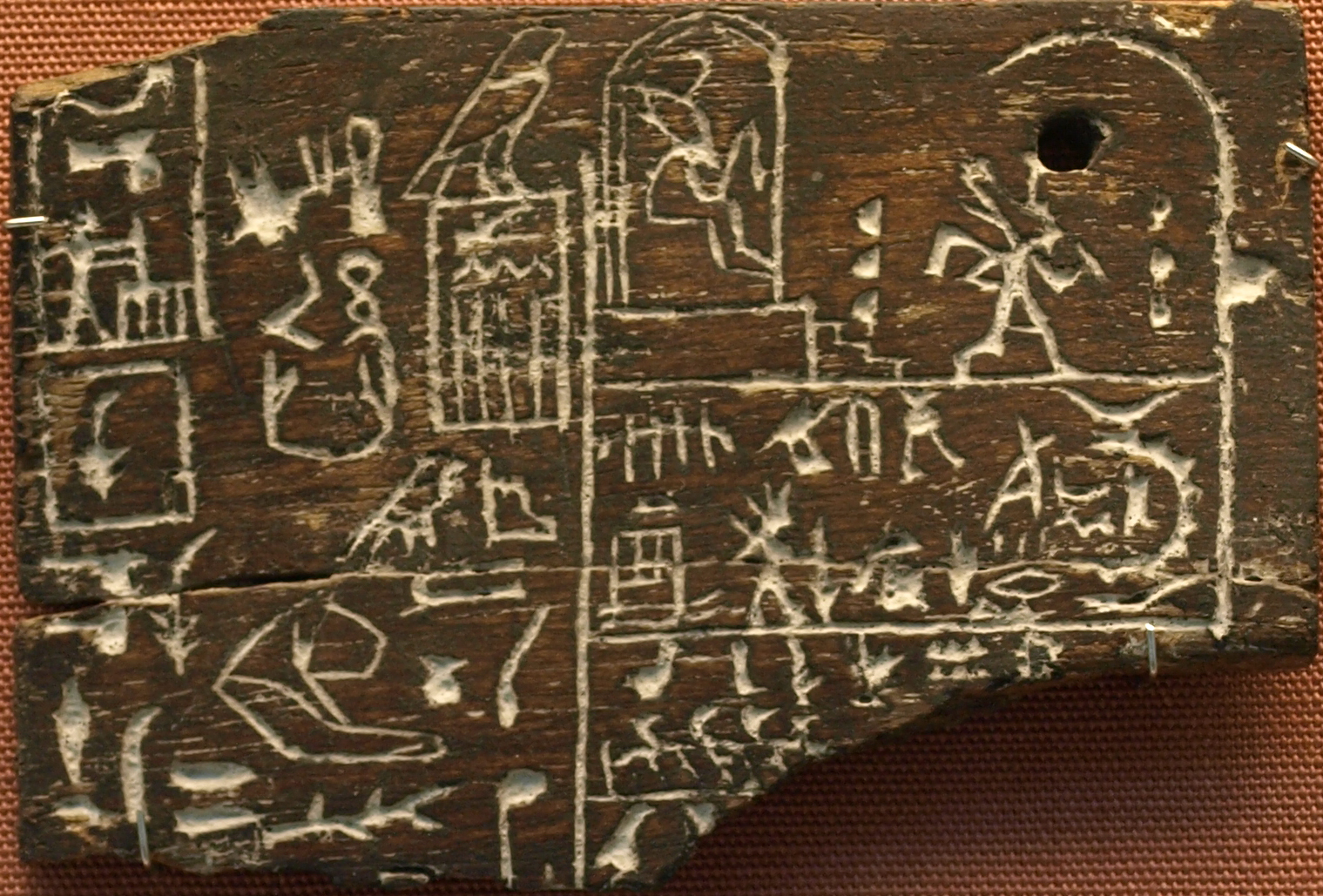
Ebony label depicting the pharaoh Den, found in his tomb in Abydos, circa 3000 BC

Ebony has a long history of use, and carved pieces have been found in Ancient Egyptian tombs.

By the end of the 16th century, fine cabinets for the luxury trade were made of ebony in Antwerp. The wood's dense hardness lent itself to refined moldings framing finely detailed pictorial panels with carving in very low relief (bas-relief), usually of allegorical subjects, or with scenes taken from classical or Christian history. Within a short time, such cabinets were also being made in Paris, where their makers became known as ébénistes, which remains the French term for a cabinetmaker.

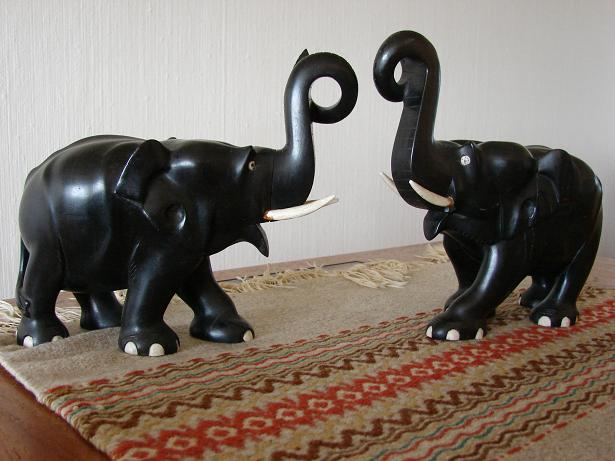
Elephant carvings from Sri Lanka, probably Gabon ebony (D. crassiflora)

Modern uses are largely restricted to small items, such as crucifixes, the main body of some musical instruments such as the clarinet, oboe, or piccolo and musical instrument parts, including black piano, organ, and harpsichord keys; violin, viola, mandolin, guitar, double bass, and cello fingerboards; tailpieces; tuning pegs; chinrests; and bow frogs. Many plectrums, or guitar picks, are made from ebony.

Traditionally, black chess pieces were made from ebony, with boxwood or ivory being used for the white pieces. Modern East Midlands-style lace-making bobbins, also being small, are often made of ebony and look particularly decorative when bound with brass or silver wire. Some expensive handgun grips and rifle fore-end tips are still made of ebony, as are the butts of pool cues.

Ebony is often cited as one of the most expensive woods in the world, along with African blackwood, sandalwood, pink ivory and agarwood.

== Conservation ==
The beauty and hardness of ebony, along with its at times total jet-black color, has long made it a sought after wood. However, ebony trees are generally small and grow very slowly. High demand and low supply has led to severe global overharvesting of ebony. Shortages in ebony drive up prices, further encouraging overharvesting. Because most ebony species are native to the developing world, poaching is particularly attractive in otherwise impoverished countries. For example, illegal logging in Madagascar has focused on ebony and rosewood poaching, which was exacerbated by the 2009 Madagascar political crisis. An ebony and rosewood expert at the Missouri Botanical Garden calls the Madagascar wood trade the "equivalent of Africa's blood diamonds".

Many ebony species are listed in the CITES appendix, which requires a permit for their international trade. Some species, such as Diospyros ebenum (Ceylon ebony) are banned for export by their home country. Species may be frequently mislabeled to evade restrictions. The poaching of elephant ivory has exacerbated the decrease in ebony, as elephants disperse ebony seeds.

Sustainable alternatives to ebony include other dark woods where a true black finish is not required (such as Juglans nigra, Handroanthus sp., or Borassus flabellifer), or black plastic in applications in which the user is unlikely to notice the difference, as truly black ebony wood has no noticeable grain. Another approach includes ebonising wood, such as with a solution of iron acetate, or commercial wood dyes.

In 2011, the Gibson Guitar company was raided by the US Fish and Wildlife Service for violations of the Lacey Act of 1900, which prohibits the illegal importation of threatened woods and other materials.

== Gallery ==
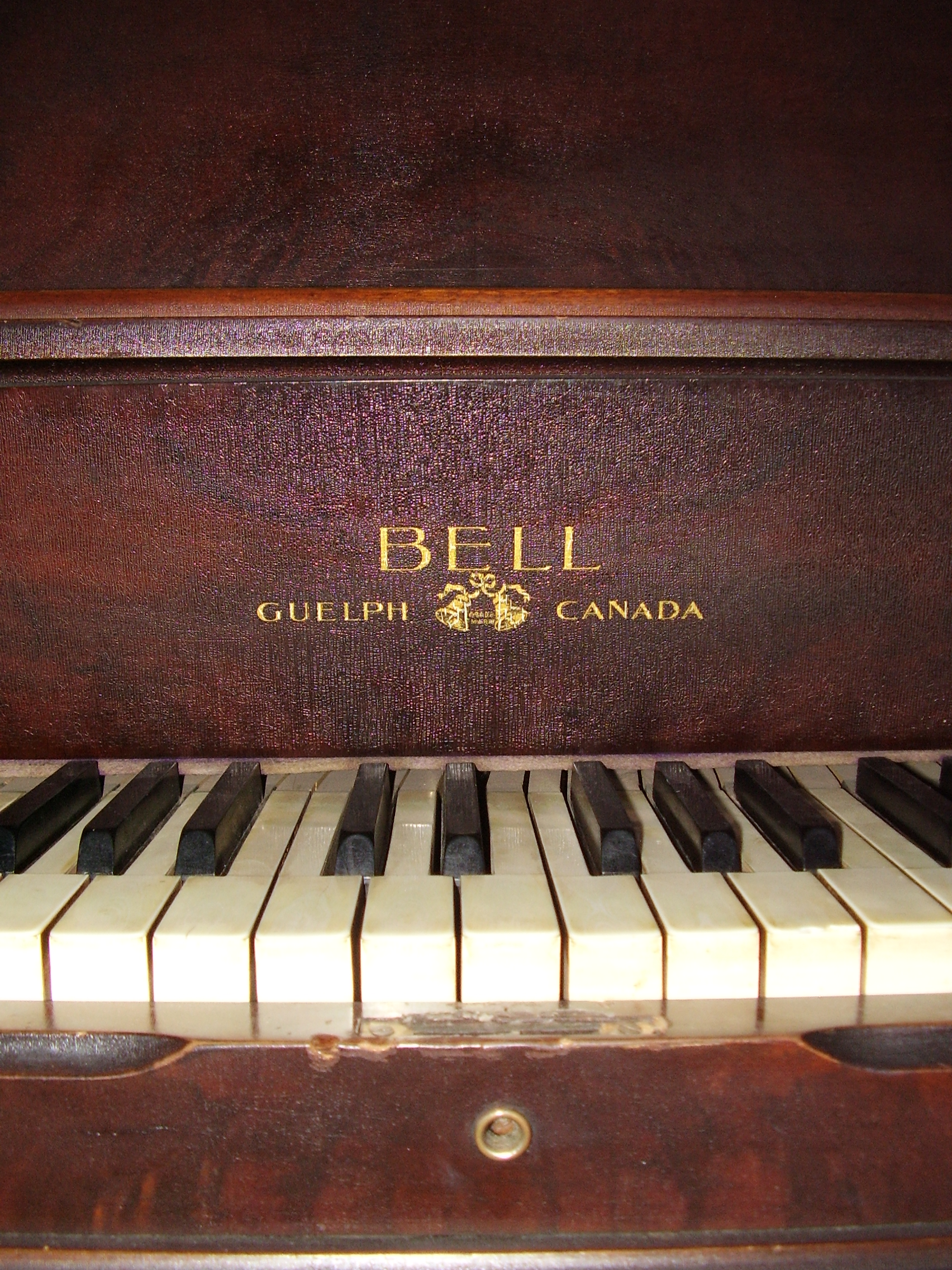
Ebony and ivory keys in a piano keyboard

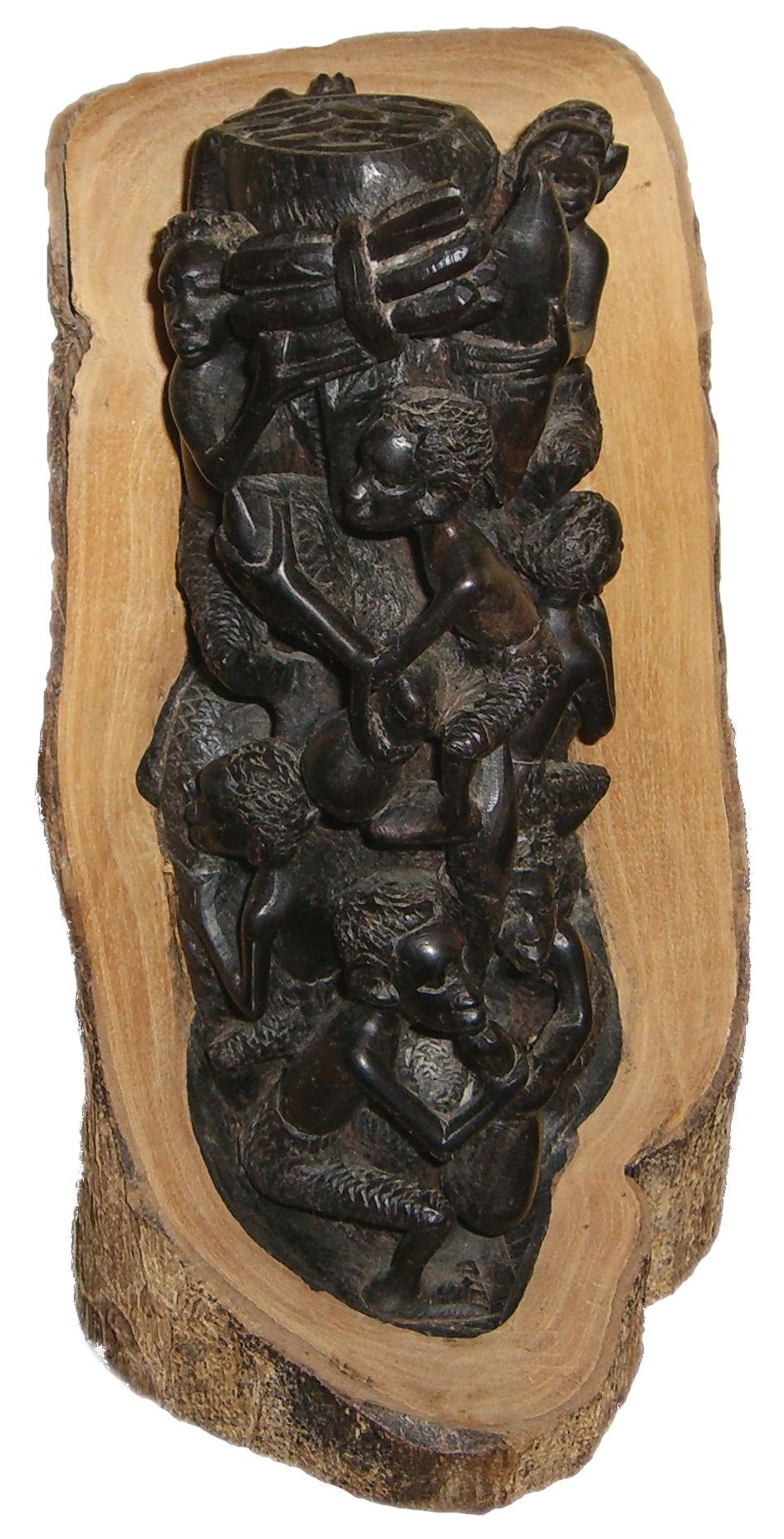
Tree of Life ebony sculpture in style of Makonde art

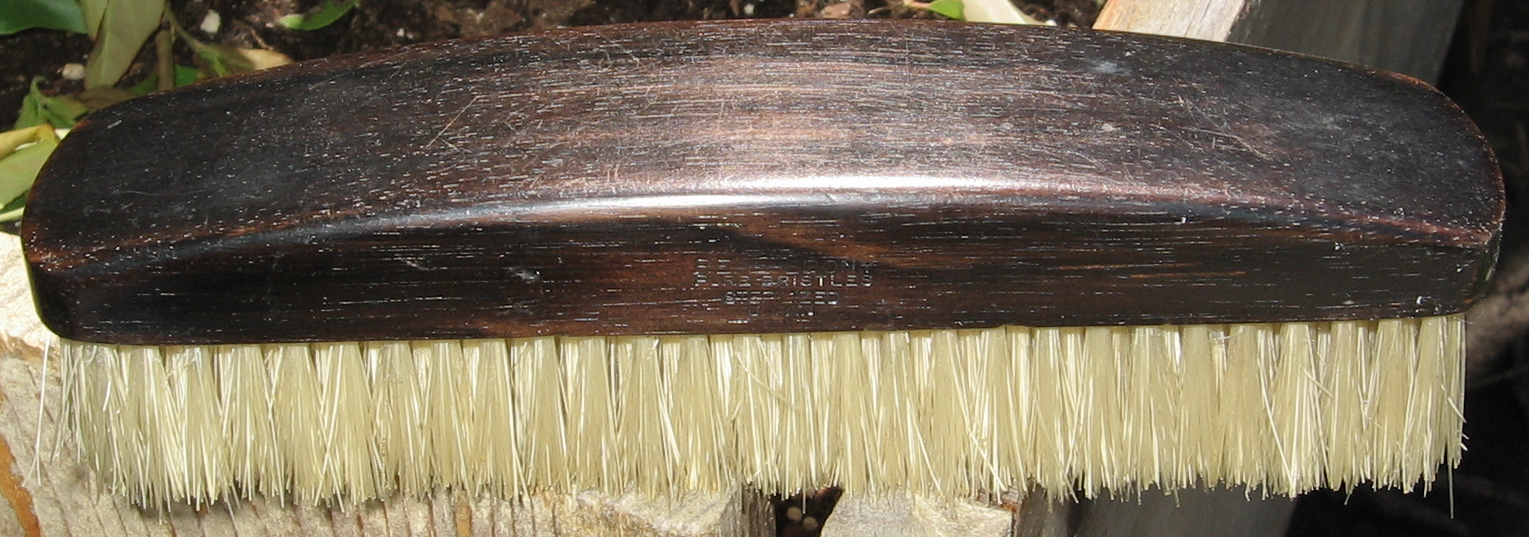
Japanese clothes brush

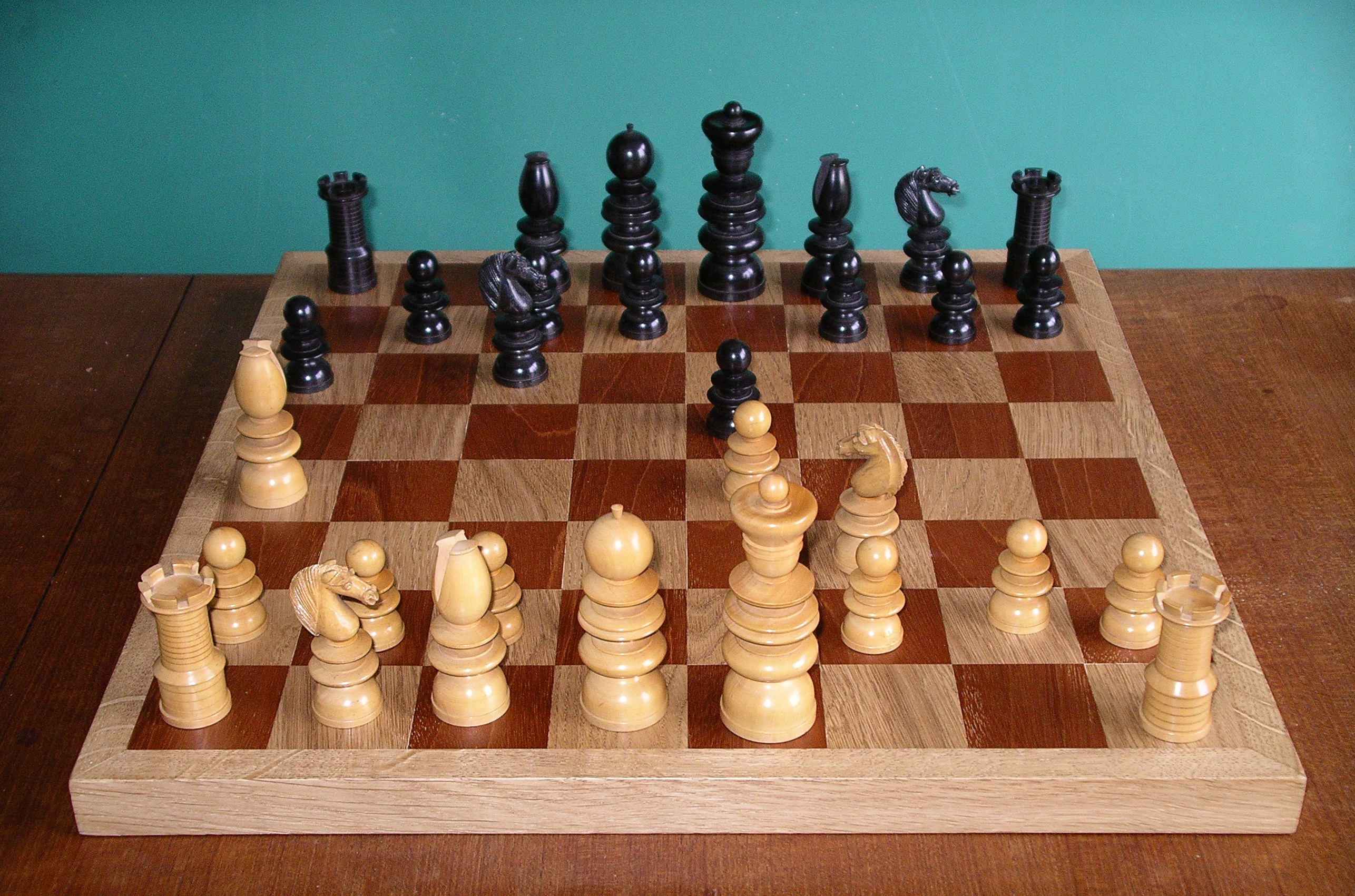
Chess set

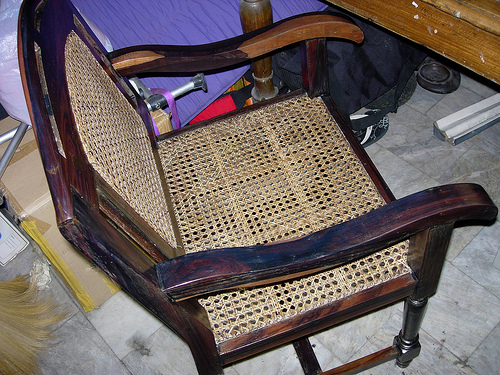
Kamagong (ebony) chair

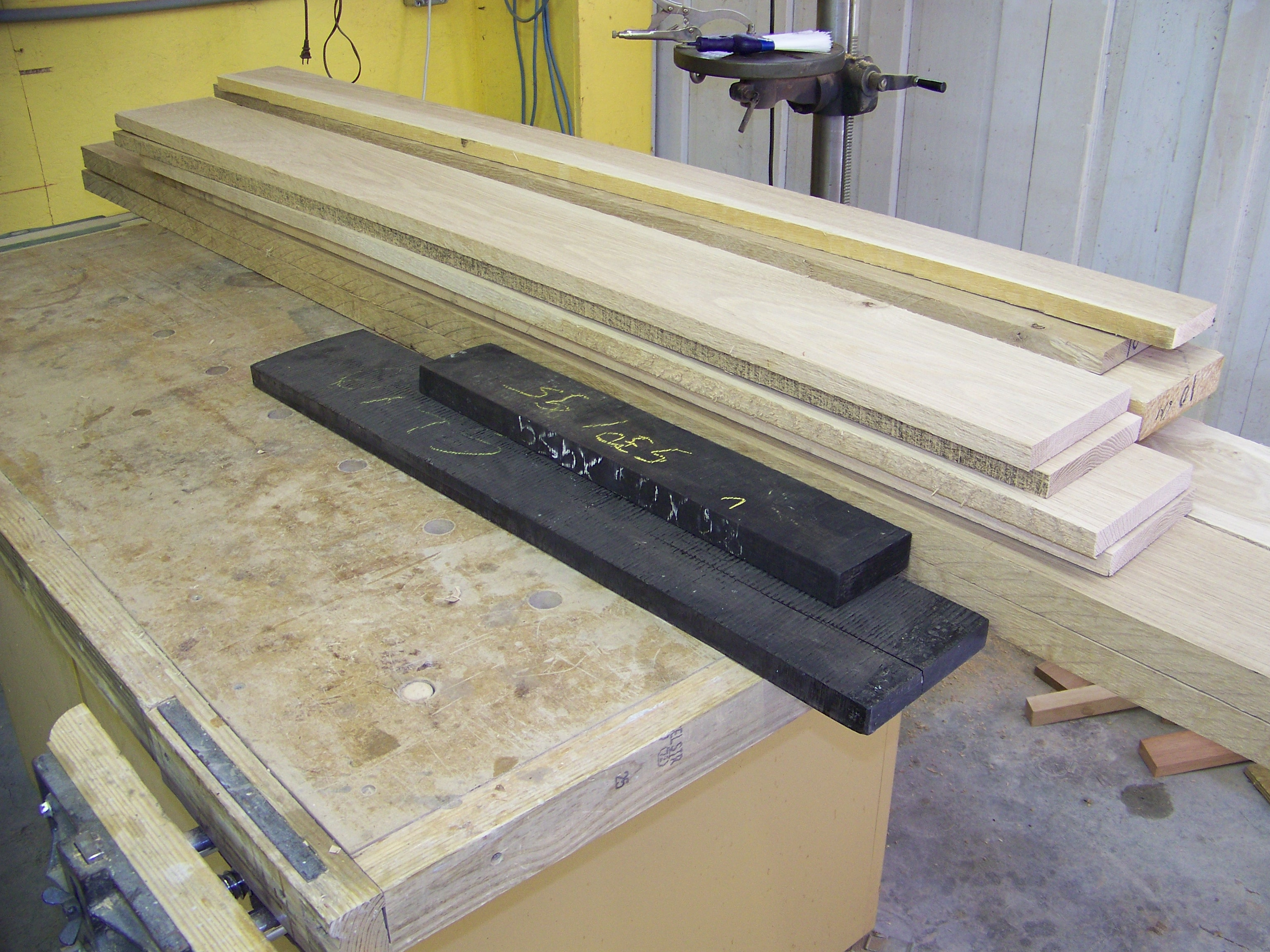
Planks of wood including Gabon ebony

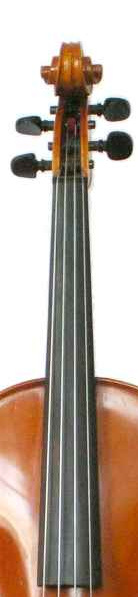
Violin fingerboard and tuning pegs

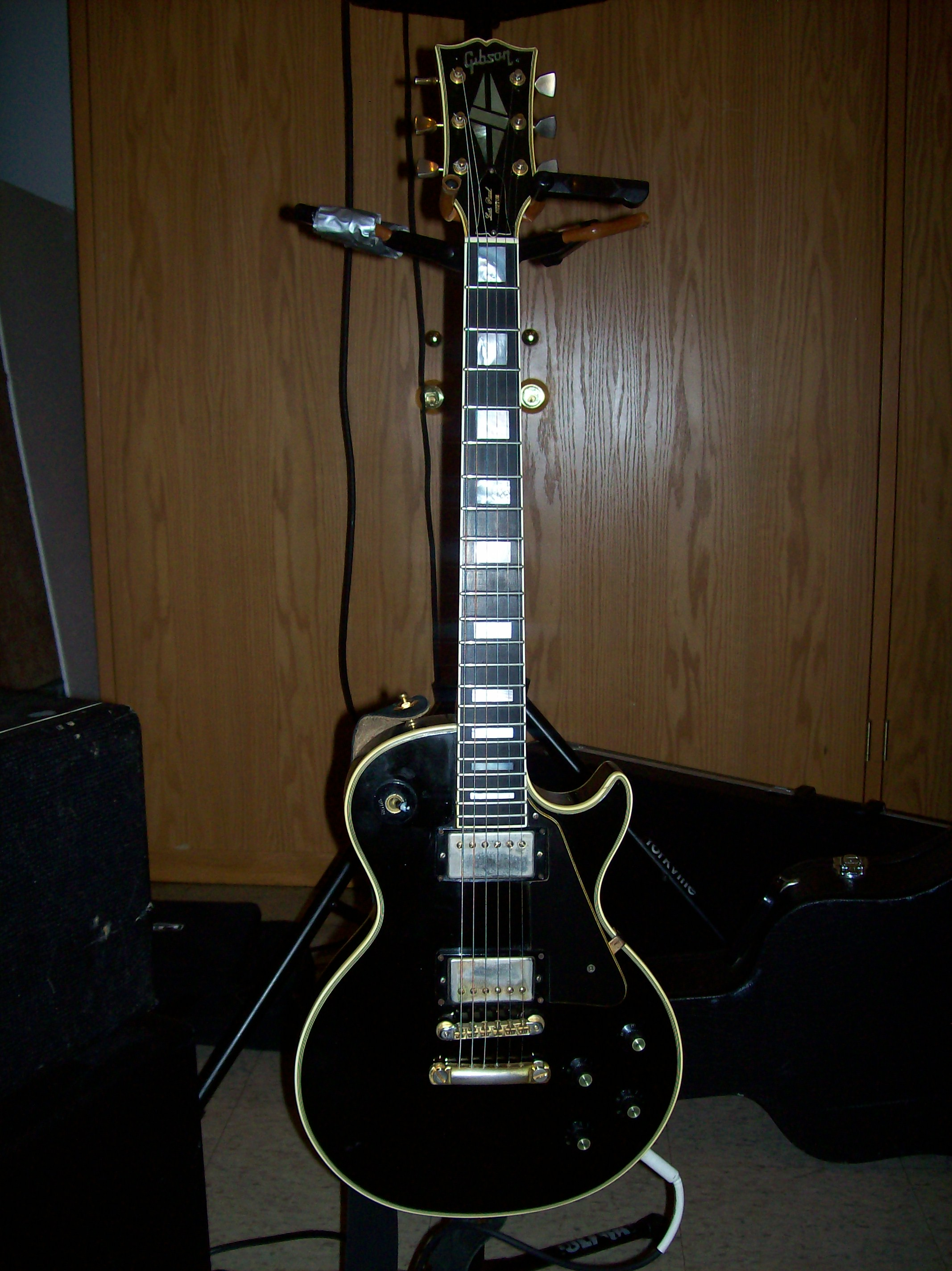
A Gibson Les Paul Custom guitar with an ebony fretboard

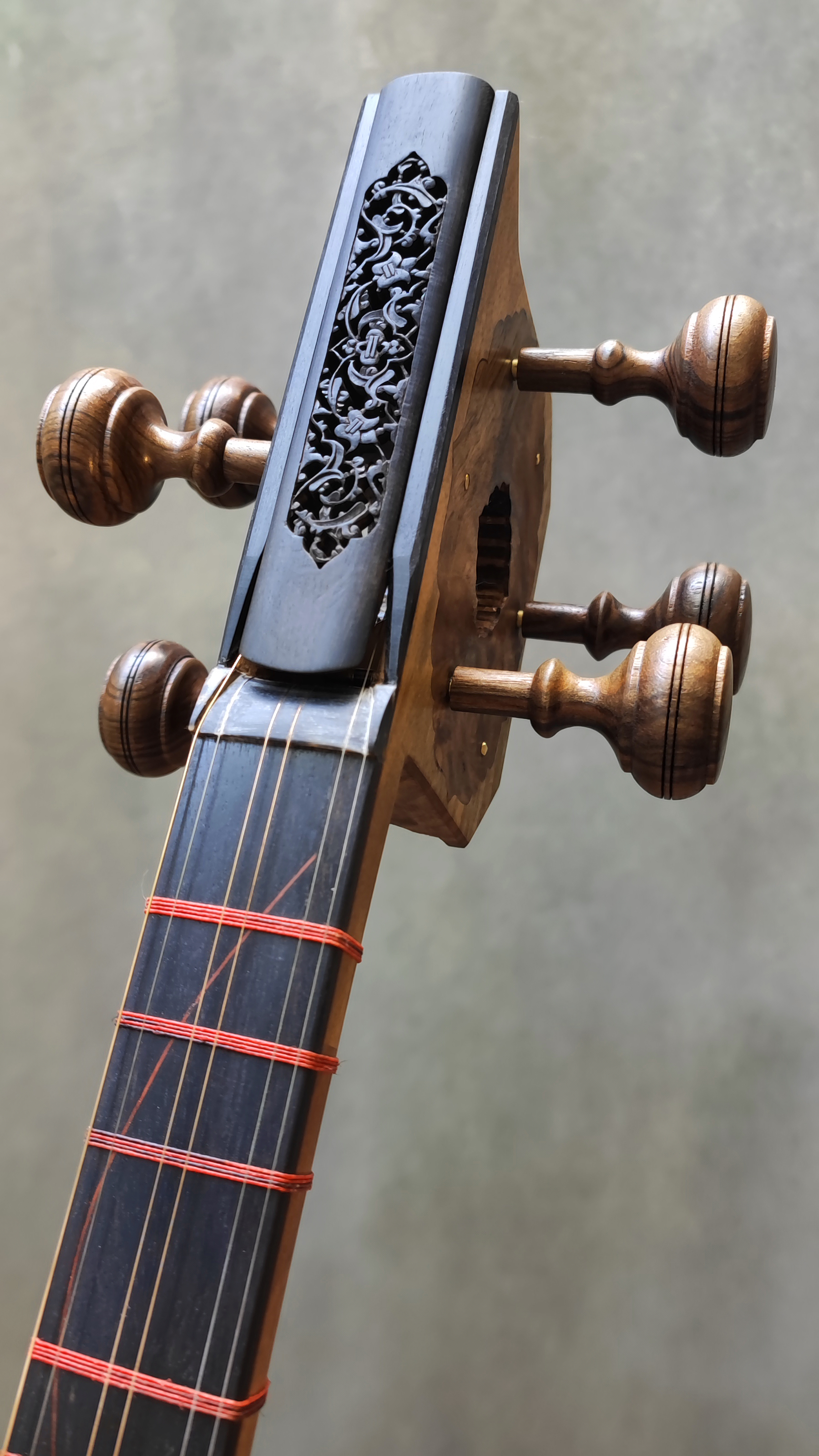
A Persian tar head with ebony

== See also ==
- African blackwood
- Calamander wood
- Ebonite
- Illegal logging in Madagascar
