= Karl August Burow =

German surgeon (1809-1874)

Karl Heinrich August Burow (10 November 1809 in Elbing – 15 April 1874 in Königsberg) was a German surgeon and ophthalmologist.

From 1830 he studied at the University of Königsberg, where his influences included Ludwig Wilhelm Sachs, Karl Ernst von Baer and Karl Friedrich Burdach. In 1839, he obtained his habilitation and in 1844 became an associate professor. In 1846, he opened a private medical clinic in Konigsberg, in which he specialized in ophthalmology and surgery. In 1859, he resigned his professorship and became a Sanitätsrat (medical officer). In 1866 he was a consultant physician to the army of Edwin Freiherr von Manteuffel, and in 1870 he performed in a similar role to the army of Prince Friedrich Karl of Prussia.

He was the first surgeon in East Prussia to perform Johann Friedrich Dieffenbach's surgery for strabismus. He is also credited for introducing new methods of blepharoplasty and cheiloplasty. The term "Burow's triangle" is defined as a triangle of skin and subcutaneous fat excised so that a pedicle flap can be advanced without buckling the adjacent tissue. Burow was a passionate advocate of open wound treatment.

Burow's solution is a preparation of aluminium subacetate and glacial acetic acid. It has astringent and antiseptic properties and is used for various skin conditions.

== Selected works ==
- Beiträge zur Physiologie und Physik des menschlichen Auges, 1841 – Contributions to the physiology and physics of the human eye.
- Resultate der Beobachtung an 137 Schieloperationen, 1844 – Observations of 137 strabismus surgeries.
- Beschreibung einer neuen Transplantations-Methode : Methode der seitlichen Dreiecke, 1855 – Description of a new transplant method (method of lateral triangles).
- Ein neues Optometer : Mit 3 lithogr. Tafeln, 1863 – A new optometer: with 3 lithographs.
- Über die Reihenfolge der Brillen-Brennweiten, 1864 – On the sequence of eyeglass focal lengths.
