= Iron acetate =

Iron acetate can refer to:

- Iron(III) acetate (ferric acetate), [Fe_{3}O(CH_{3}CO_{2}^{−})_{6}(H_{2}O)_{3}]CH_{3}CO_{2}^{−}
- Iron(II) acetate (ferrous acetate), Fe(CH_{3}COO)_{2}

== See also ==
- kanemizu (鉄奨水, lit. 'iron juice water'), a solution of Iron(III) acetate used to blacken teeth
