= African ebony =

African ebony is a common name for several plants and may refer to:

- Diospyros crassiflora, native to the rain-forests of western Africa, the source of a wood valued for making musical instruments
- Diospyros mespiliformis, native to the savannas of western, eastern and southern Africa
