= Aluminium citrate =

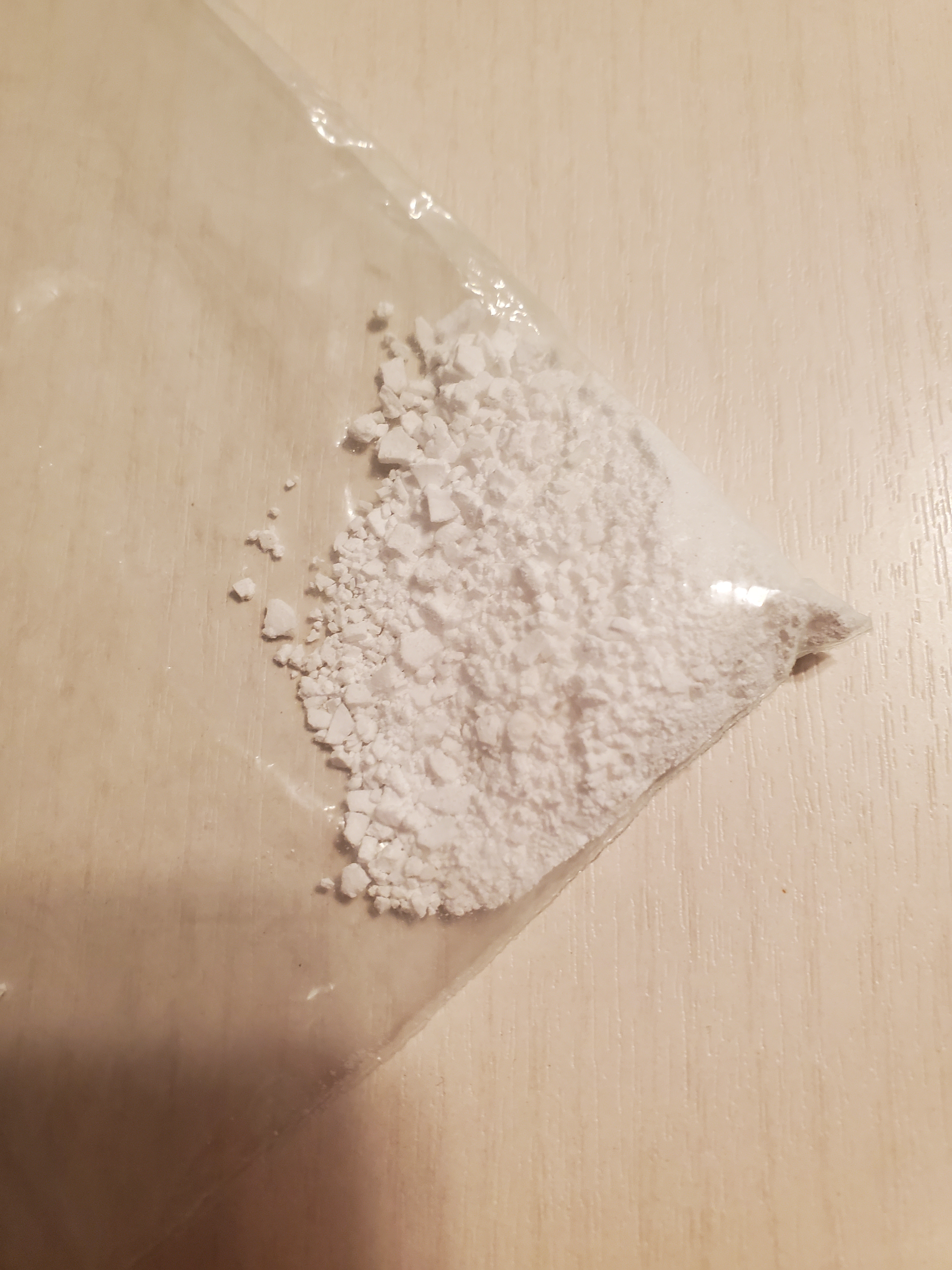
- Aluminium citrate

Names
- IUPAC name Aluminium 2-hydroxypropane-1,2,3-tricarboxylate
- Other names: Aluminium(III) citrate

Identifiers
CAS Number	31142-56-0
3D model (JSmol)	Interactive image
ChemSpider	82709
ECHA InfoCard	100.045.881
EC Number	250-484-4
PubChem CID	91599
UNII	IJ623779BA
CompTox Dashboard (EPA)	DTXSID3030711
- InChI: InChI=1S/C6H8O7.Al/c7-3(8)1-6(13,5(11)12)2-4(9)10;/h13H,1-2H2,(H,7,8)(H,9,10)(H,11,12);/q;+3/p-3 Key: ZUGAOYSWHHGDJY-UHFFFAOYSA-K
- SMILES: C(C(=O)[O-])C(CC(=O)[O-])(C(=O)[O-])O.[Al+3]

Properties
Chemical formula	C_{6}H_{5}AlO_{7}
Molar mass	216.081 g·mol^{−1}
Appearance	White solid
Solubility in water	Insoluble

Pharmacology
- Pharmacokinetics
Excretion	Kidney

Hazards
- GHS labelling
Pictograms	(GHS07: Exclamation mark) (GHS08: Health hazard)
Signal word	Warning
Hazard statements	H302, H315, H319, H373
Precautionary statements	P260, P264, P270, P280, P301+P312, P302+P352, P305+P351+P338, P314, P321, P330, P332+P313, P337+P313, P362, P501

Related compounds
Other anions	Aluminium acetate
- Except where otherwise noted, data are given for materials in their standard state (at 25 °C [77 °F], 100 kPa). Infobox references

Aluminium citrate is a chemical compound with the chemical formula AlC_{6}H_{5}O_{7}. This white, crystalline salt is produced by mixing aluminium chloride hexahydrate and citric acid.

== Uses ==
Aluminium citrate can be used as a crosslinker for many polymers in the oil industry. It is also used as an antiperspirant.

== Effects on humans ==
Aluminium citrate takes up about 8% of aluminium in blood due to the ability of Al^{3+} ions to replace Ca^{2+} from calcium citrate and is known to cause chronic renal failure because it causes an increase of phosphorus in the kidneys. It has been suspected to cause Alzheimer's disease but more evidence is needed. This compound can also have some positive effects on humans such as preventing silicosis. When ingested, 80% of the compound is excreted through the body through urine and the rest comes out slower.

== Aluminium citrate complexes ==
Aluminium citrate can form complexes such as ammonium aluminium citrate ((NH_{4})_{4}Al_{3}C_{6}H_{4}O_{7}(OH)(H_{2}O)), which can be created by mixing aluminium nitrate nonahydrate, citric acid, and ammonium hydroxide.
