= Aluminium acetate =

Aluminium acetate or aluminium ethanoate (also "aluminum ~" in North American English), sometimes abbreviated AlAc in geochemistry, can refer to a number of different salts of aluminium with acetic acid. In the solid state, three salts exist under this name: basic aluminium monoacetate, (HO)_{2}AlCH_{3}CO_{2}, basic aluminium diacetate, HOAl(CH_{3}CO_{2})_{2}, and neutral aluminium triacetate, Al(CH_{3}CO_{2})_{3.} In aqueous solution, aluminium triacetate hydrolyses to form a mixture of the other two, and all solutions of all three can be referred to as "aluminium acetate" as the species formed coexist and inter-convert in chemical equilibrium.

== Stoichiometry ==
=== Monoacetate ===
Aluminium monoacetate, also known as dibasic aluminium acetate, forms from Al(OH)_{3} and dilute aqueous acetic acid. More concentrated acid leads to the di- and triacetate.

=== Diacetate ===
Aluminium diacetate, also known as basic aluminium acetate, is prepared from aqueous aluminium acetate solution resulting in a white powder. This basic salt forms from the hydrolysis of the triacetate in water.

=== Triacetate ===
Aluminium triacetate is a chemical compound that is prepared by heating aluminium chloride (AlCl_{3}) or Al powder with a mixture of acetic acid (CH_{3}COOH) and acetic anhydride (C_{4}H_{6}O_{3}). It is referred as the normal salt and is only made in the absence of water at a relatively high temperature like 180 °C.
