= Aluminium sulfacetate =

Chemical compound

Aluminium sulfacetate is a mixture of aluminium salts dissolved in water with formula Al_{2}SO_{4}(CH_{3}CO_{2})_{4}.

== Uses ==
It is an evenly balanced mixture of aluminium sulfate and aluminium acetate. It can be used as a mordant, which is a substance used to set dyes on fabrics that typically contains a polyvalent metal ion like aluminium or iron, In mixtures with basic aluminium diacetate or aluminium sulfacetate, aluminium triacetate has been used as a mordant with alizarin dye. In 1899, Albert Ganswindt recommended that the use of impure sulfacetates that are empyreumatic liquids "should be abandoned" in favour of pure preparations. Empyreuma is an obsolete chemical and medical term referring to "the smell and taste associated with burning vegetable and animal matter", and likely results in this case from the use of pyroligneous acid (wood acid) or wood acid lime in the preparation of the mordant.

== Preparation ==
A common approach to preparing aluminium sulfacetate is by reaction of aluminium sulfate with lead(II) acetate. The relative amount of each reagent controls the composition of the resulting mixture. When the stoichiometric ratio of lead acetate to aluminium sulfate exceeds 3:1, the process is theoretically driven to completion and aluminium triacetate is the sole product. With less lead acetate, a mixture of aluminium triacetate and aluminium sulfacetate results that becomes increasingly rich in the latter as the reagent mole ratio approaches 2:1. This approach is used to form various mixtures for mordant applications:

Al_{2}(SO_{4})_{3} + 3 Pb(CH_{3}CO_{2})_{2} → 2 Al(CH_{3}CO_{2})_{3} + 3 PbSO_{4}

Basic aluminium sulfacetates can also be prepared, Al_{2}SO_{4}(CH_{3}CO_{2})_{4 - n}(OH)_{n}, with hydroxide anions replacing some acetate ions. The extreme cases are aluminium sulfacetate itself (n = 0) and the double salt of aluminium sulfate and aluminium hydroxide (n = 4 case, Al_{2}SO_{4}(OH)_{4}). Aluminium sulfacetate is made from the hydrates of aluminium sulfate and lead acetate:

Al_{2}(SO_{4})_{3}•18H_{2}O + 2 Pb(CH_{3}CO_{2})_{2}•3H_{2}O → Al_{2}SO_{4}(CH_{3}CO_{2})_{4} + 2 PbSO_{4} + 24 H_{2}O

The n = 1 and n = 2 cases, both of which are basic aluminium sulfacetates, are prepared using sodium bicarbonate along with the reagents:

2 Al_{2}(SO_{4})_{3}•18H_{2}O + 3 Pb(CH_{3}CO_{2})_{2}•3H_{2}O + 2 NaHCO_{3} → Al_{2}SO_{4}(CH_{3}CO_{2})_{3}OH + 3 PbSO_{4} + Na_{2}SO_{4} + 2 CO_{2} + 45 H_{2}O

Al_{2}(SO_{4})_{3}•18H_{2}O + Pb(CH_{3}CO_{2})_{2}•3H_{2}O + 2 NaHCO_{3} → Al_{2}SO_{4}(CH_{3}CO_{2})_{2}(OH)_{2} + PbSO_{4} + Na_{2}SO_{4} + 2 CO_{2} + 21 H_{2}O

The n = 3 case, also a basic aluminium sulfacetate, is prepared using acetic acid instead of lead acetate, along with sodium bicarbonate:

Al_{2}(SO_{4})_{3}•18H_{2}O + CH_{3}COOH + 4 NaHCO_{3} → Al_{2}SO_{4}(CH_{3}CO_{2})(OH)_{3} + 2 Na_{2}SO_{4} + CO_{2} + 19 H_{2}O
