= Tight lip syndrome =

Congenital disorder affecting Shar Pei puppies

Tight lip syndrome is a congenital disorder observed in some Shar Pei puppies where the lower lip curls over the mandibular teeth, particularly affecting the canine and incisor teeth. This abnormal lip positioning causes the mandibular teeth to be pushed inward, disrupting normal jaw alignment and growth. As puppies grow, the maxilla typically expands before the mandible. The interference caused by the curled lip can prevent the mandible from growing properly and can lead to a misalignment of the teeth.

== Background ==
In the 1990s, selective breeding resulted in Shar Pei dogs with an increased amount of facial flesh, leading to a range of health problems, including small external auditory canals, edematous facial features, and traumatic occlusions. Breeding for heavier, smushier faces in particular led to the condition referred to as "tight lip syndrome," in which the lower lip may cover the mandibular incisor teeth, causing lingual tipping of these teeth and impeding normal bite alignment, leading to an underbite.

== Clinical presentation ==
Affected dogs often exhibit a lower lip that covers the incisal edges of the mandibular incisor teeth, as well as secondary trauma from the maxillary incisor teeth. This can result in a shallow vestibule, making eating and oral comfort challenging. Early signs include sloppiness while eating and frequent biting of the lip, which indicates discomfort.

== Diagnosis ==
The condition is diagnosed through physical examination, noting the abnormal lip curl and the resulting misalignment of the teeth. Affected puppies may experience discomfort from biting their own lip.

== Treatment ==
Surgical intervention is the primary treatment for tight lip syndrome. Cheiloplasty is a procedure performed to reposition the lower lip and allow it to heal in a normal position. This involves making an incision along the mucogingival junction and adjusting the lip. Post-operative care requires daily manipulation to prevent the lip from returning to its previous position. Chin skin resection, another surgical option, involves removing excess skin from the chin to prevent the lip from curling over the teeth. This method is typically used in older dogs where managing comfort is more critical than ensuring jaw growth.

The vestibule deepening procedure for tight lip syndrome involves making a craniocaudal incision in the chin's skin to create additional space in the oral vestibule. The extent of the incision is based on the severity of the condition: a basic incision is used for mandibular incisor teeth only, while more extensive incisions are required if the canine and premolar teeth are affected. The procedure aims to relieve pressure from the lip on the teeth and improve oral function. Nonabsorbable sutures secure the adjusted lip position, and post-operative care involves monitoring and ensuring proper healing to prevent recurrence and ensure optimal results.

In most cases, surgical correction reduces discomfort and improves jaw alignment. However, due to the risk of recurrence or inadequate initial correction, follow-up care is essential to ensure the desired outcome. The condition is managed effectively through these surgical approaches, although care must be taken to choose the appropriate procedure based on the age and specific needs of the dog. Surgical correction is best performed at an early age. Daily digital palpation of the wound can help prevent the lip from reattaching to the mandibular dental arcade during the healing process.
