= Pyroligneous acid =

Names
- Other names wood vinegar and wood acid

Identifiers
CAS Number	8030-97-5
ECHA InfoCard	100.029.495
EC Number	232-450-0
UNII	N4G9GAT76C
CompTox Dashboard (EPA)	DTXSID601009788

Properties
Appearance	Yellow to red liquid
Odor	acrid smoky
Density	1.08 g/mL
Boiling point	99 °C (210 °F; 372 K)
Refractive index (n_{D})	1.371-1.378

Hazards
- GHS labelling
Pictograms	(GHS02: Flammable) (GHS07: Exclamation mark)
Signal word	Warning
Hazard statements	H226, H312, H315, H319, H335
Flash point	44 °C (111 °F; 317 K)

Related compounds
Related compounds	Liquid smoke
- Except where otherwise noted, data are given for materials in their standard state (at 25 °C [77 °F], 100 kPa). Infobox references

Pyroligneous acid, also called wood vinegar or wood acid, is a dark liquid produced by the destructive distillation of wood and other plant materials.

== Composition ==
The principal components of pyroligneous acid are 10% acetic acid, acetone and methanol. It was once used as a commercial source for acetic acid.

== History ==
Pyroligneous acid (acetum lignorum) was investigated by German chemist Johann Rudolph Glauber. The acid was used as a substitute for vinegar. It was also used topically for treating wounds, ulcers and other ailments.

A factory producing Pyroligneous Acid or woodnaphtha was built by the side of the road at Black Pill near Swansea. A complaint from D. Berrington, Woodland Castle was lodged with the General Board of Health concerning the noxious vapours and effluent, 26 October 1855. This was supported by Dr Williams and Dr Rowland of Swansea saying fumes from the works were injurious to public health.

During the United States Civil War it became increasingly difficult for the Confederate States of America to obtain much needed salt. Curing meat and fish with pyroligneous acid was attempted by cooks to compensate for this deficiency, but it was insufficient.

In the nineteenth century, pyroligneous acid was used to prepare an impure aluminium sulfacetate mordant for use with cotton, but the resulting mixture imparted a burnt odor to the cotton, and Ganswindt recommended its use be abandoned in favour of purer preparations in 1899.

In 1895, pyroligneous acid was first marketed under the brand Wright's Liquid Smoke, a liquid smoke product intended to impart the flavor and some of the preservative effects of wood smoking to meats and vegetables. In the early 21st century, concerns about the carcinogenic effects of components of wood smoke decreased the production of heavily smoked foods in favor of lighter smoking and liquid smoke for foods.
