= Liquid smoke =

Edible chemical compound

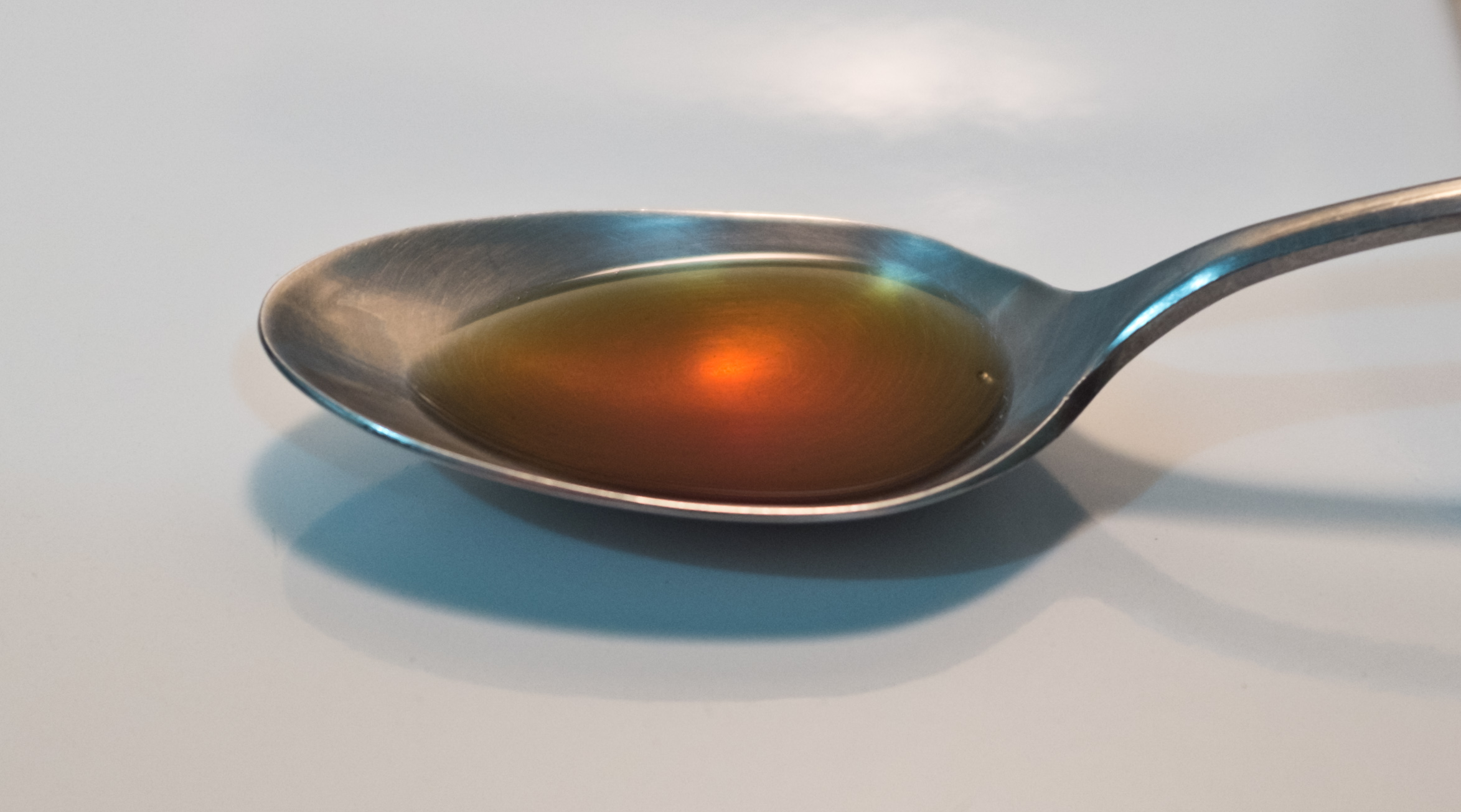

Names
- Other names wood vinegar, pyroligneous acid, smoke flavor, smoke flavouring(s), natural condensed smoke

Properties
Appearance	Yellow to red liquid
Odor	acrid smoky
Solubility in water	miscible
Solubility in ethanol	miscible
Solubility in propylene glycol	miscible
Solubility in oils	immiscible

Related compounds
Related compounds	Pyroligneous acid
- Except where otherwise noted, data are given for materials in their standard state (at 25 °C [77 °F], 100 kPa). Infobox references

Liquid smoke is a water-soluble yellow to red liquid used as a flavoring to substitute for cooking with wood smoke. It can be used to flavor any meat or vegetable. It is available as pure condensed smoke from various types of wood, and as derivative formulas containing additives.

== History ==
Pyrolysis or thermal decomposition of wood in a low oxygen manner originated prehistorically to produce charcoal. Condensates of the vapors eventually were made and found useful as preservatives. For centuries, water-based condensates of wood smoke were popularly called "wood vinegar", presumably due to its use as food vinegar. In 1658, Johann Rudolf Glauber outlined the methods to produce wood vinegar during charcoal making. Further, he described the use of the water insoluble tar fraction as a wood preservative and documented the freezing of the wood vinegar to concentrate it. Use of the term "pyroligneous acid" for wood vinegar emerged by 1788.

In the United States, in 1895, E. H. Wright inaugurated the era of commercial distribution of pyroligneous acid under a new name, liquid smoke. Among Wright's innovations were the standardization of the product, marketing and distribution. Wright's Liquid Smoke, since 1997 owned by B&G Foods, and its modern-day successors have always been the subject of controversy about their contents and production, but in 1913, Wright prevailed in a federal misbranding case. Case judge Van Valkenburg wrote:

The Government, in trying to show that this is not smoke produced by combustion, has shown that it is produced in exactly the same kind of way that is stated on that label. The fact is that they have produced something here which they say has something of the flavor and properties similar to the curative properties of smoke; they get it out of wood and they get it by distillation and it turns out to be a substance like, if not exactly identical with pyroligneous acid. Well, nobody could be deceived into thinking it was specifically what the indictment charges they are being deceived with. It is a thing which is produced in such a manner from the art and methods employed in it, that the application of the term "smoke" to it seems to me to be apt or applicable instead of deceptive, and it does not deceive in the sense this statute implies.

Historically, all pyroligneous acid products, Wright's product and many other condensates have been made as byproducts of charcoal manufacturing, which was of greater value. Chemicals such as methanol, acetic acid and acetone have been isolated from these condensates and sold. With the advent of lower cost fossil fuel sources, today these and other wood-derived chemicals retain only small niches. Today there are many manufacturing locations around the world, most of which pyrolyze wood primarily to generate condensates which are further processed to make hundreds of derivative products. These are now referred to less as liquid smoke products, and instead as smoke flavorings, smoke flavors, and natural condensed smoke.

== Production ==
The condensed products from the destructive distillation of wood are called "liquid smoke" or "pyroligneous acid". There are no standards of identity, prescribed production methods, or tests which distinguish between liquid smoke and pyroligneous acid; they can be considered to be the same. However, the numerous variables that are manipulated during pyrolysis do lead to a wide range of compositions of the condensates. In addition, implementation of many further processing steps by concentration, dilution, distillation, extraction, and use of food additives has led to the many hundreds of different products on the market worldwide.

Wood, particularly hardwood, is by far the most widely used biomass pyrolyzed to make liquid smoke. Commercial products are made using both batch and continuous methods. Commercial products are made using a range of reactors from rotary calciners, heated screws, batch charcoal kilns, to fast pyrolysis reactors. The process type and conditions of processing lead to greater variances between the condensates than the differences between the common wood types that are in use. Variables such as feed rate, vapor residence time, particle size, oxygen infiltration, and temperature can have substantial effects on yield and composition of the condensates. Wide ranges of chemical composition are reported throughout the literature and unless the process and conditions are cited, there is limited utility of such results. Commercial manufacturers strive to control their manufacturing variables in order to standardize product compositions.

Water is added either during condensation or after to cause separation of three fractions. Once water is added, the aqueous phase becomes the largest and most useful fraction. It contains wood-derived chemical compounds of higher chemical polarity such as those found in carboxylic acid, aldehyde, and phenol chemical classes. Many compounds together are responsible for the flavor, browning, antioxidant, and antimicrobial effects of smoke and liquid smoke. The smallest condensed fraction is the lowest-polarity upper phase which a mix of phytosterols and other oily, waxy substances. The lower phase is commonly referred to as tar. It is an intermediate-polarity mixture of phenolic polymers, secondary and tertiary reaction products, some of the water-soluble polar compounds partitioned in the amount of which is governed by individual partition coefficients, water and the bulk of the polycyclic aromatic hydrocarbons. Wood tar has been used as a preservative, water repellent, and antiseptic. Tar from birch was produced as a commodity product on large scale in northern Europe. Today commercial liquid smoke products are still prepared from this phase. Liquid smoke condensates are made commercially for the global meat industry in the U.S. and Europe and are regulated by governments. Liquid smoke is still referred to as wood vinegar, and is made and used indigenously in places including Japan, China, Indonesia, Malaysia, Brazil, and Southeast Asia.

== Use ==
=== Food ===
A bottle of liquid smoke concentrate

The application of liquid smoke to food has grown to encompass a wide variety of methods employing thousands of commercial formulations worldwide. Liquid smoke is used extensively by topical application to replace direct wood-smoking of food. In addition to flavor, reaction color, anti-microbial, and texture effects are obtained by topical addition followed by thermal processing. Dipping products in diluted solutions or soaking them in brines containing liquid smoke followed by heating was done long before the modern industrial era using Wright's liquid smoke and pyroligneous acid precursors. Allen patented a method of regenerating smoke using air atomization, which is still the leading technology for using condensed smoke products to treat processed meat, cheese, fish, and other foods in batch smokehouses.

As the meat-processing industry has consolidated, continuous processes have evolved, and direct applications of solutions of liquid smoke via showering or drenching systems installed on continuous lines are the usual methods of application. In North America, there are more than thirty-five processed-meat plants utilizing bulk tanks to receive tankers of liquid smoke for topical application as an alternative to direct wood smoking. Topical application by impregnation of fibrous, laminated, and plastic casings is also used; meat products are stuffed into these casings and thermally processed.

The use of natural condensed smoke preparations internally in food is another way to impart smoke flavor, used when other technical functions of smoke do not need to be expressed in a finished food. This can be done directly by adding into blenders with meat or other foods, or injecting whole muscle meat. The smoke flavors can also be incorporated into sauces such as barbeque or dry seasonings. Aqueous smoke solutions can also be extracted into oil, spray-dried using maltodextrin carriers, or plated onto foods and food ingredients such as malt flour, yeast, or salt.

=== Non-food ===
Extensive references to beneficial uses of pyroligneous acid in plants for seed germination, pest control, microbial control, plant structural enhancements are reported. Livestock benefits such as antimicrobial preservation of feed, nutrient digestibility, and other claims are found. Scientific agricultural studies can be found in peer-reviewed journals, but many agricultural benefits such as soil quality improvement, better seed germination, and healthier foliage are widely promoted without attribution. Broad claims of medical benefits to humans in digestive ailments, dental infections, liver, heart, skin ailments, ears, eyes are found, but the literature is devoid of accepted scientific studies for such testimonial claims in humans.

== Safety ==
The first government-sanctioned assessment of liquid smoke was undertaken by the United States Food and Drug Administration (FDA) in 1981. The committee commissioned by the FDA to evaluate information on the products concluded there was no evidence demonstrating the products were a hazard to the public the way they were being used. Today, these products stand as Generally Recognized as Safe (GRAS) in the United States and may be used at levels necessary to produce the intended technical effects. Manufacturing plants where liquid smoke is made are regulated and inspected by the FDA.

The European Union established procedures for the safety assessment and the authorization of smoke flavorings used or intended for use in or on foods in 2003. The European Food Safety Authority (EFSA) was charged with evaluating information on primary condensate smoke flavorings. Information on twelve products from ten applicants were evaluated by EFSA. Opinions were published on all twelve. The products considered were what each applicant considered their own primary product prior to any further processing or derivatization.

All twelve products were determined to be genotoxic positive by in vitro methods. However, when evaluated by in vivo methods ten were found to not be of concern by EFSA. The AM-01 product was judged inconclusive and FF-B was considered weakly genotoxic. Based upon the NOAEL determinations for each product and supplemental information supplied by some manufacturers, usage limits for most products have been established and are conveyed by manufacturers to users. Most of these primary products and their derivatives remain in commercial use. Only products which are the subjects of these evaluations are authorized to be used in commerce within the EU.
