= Aluminium monoacetate =

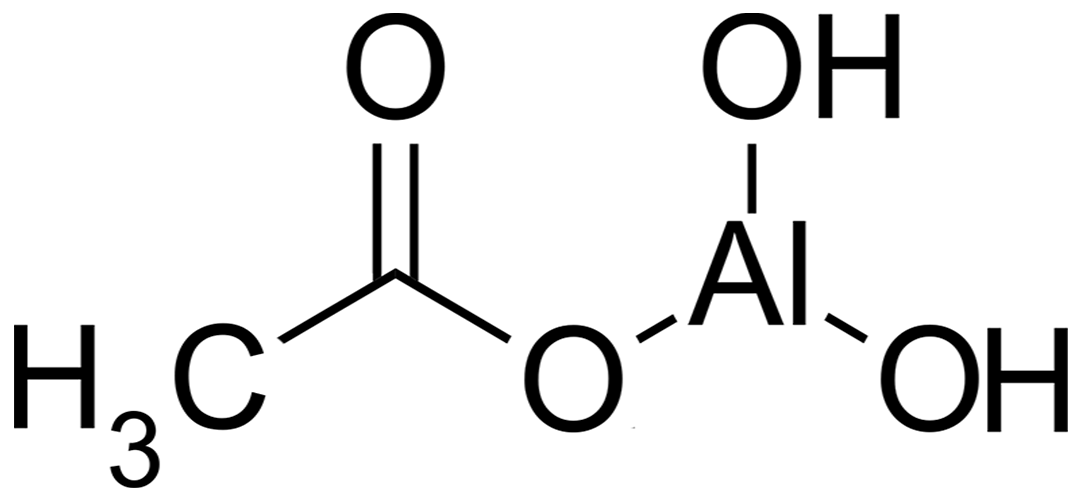

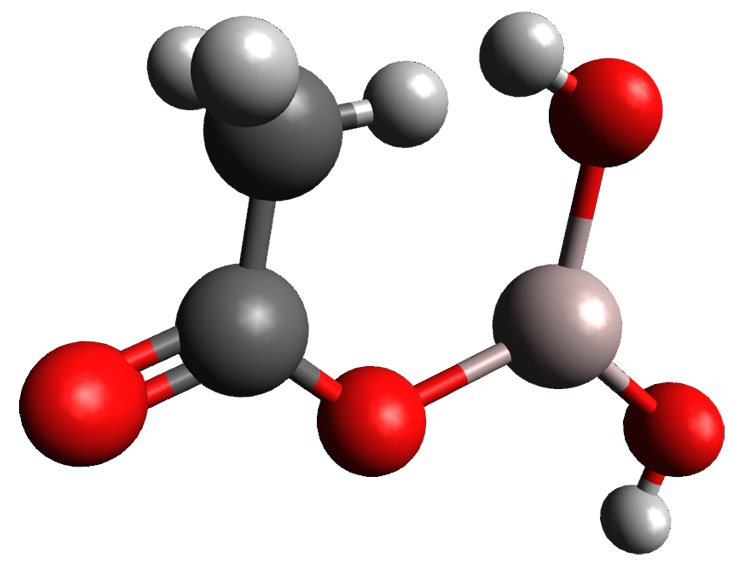

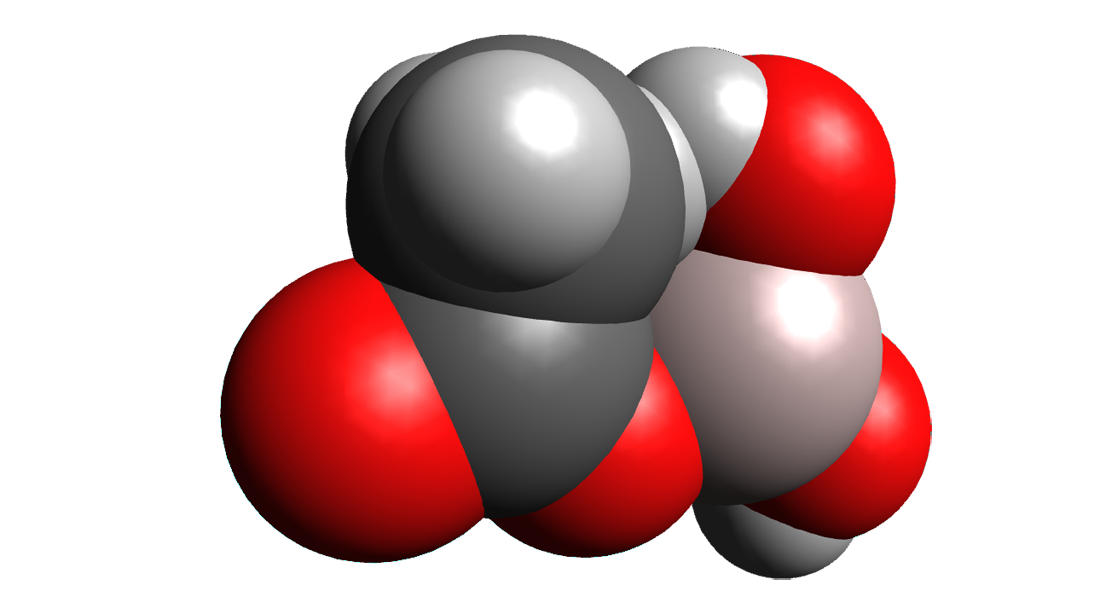

Names
- IUPAC name Aluminium monoacetate
- Other names Basic aluminium monoacetate Dihydroxyaluminium acetate

Identifiers
CAS Number	7360-44-3
3D model (JSmol)	Interactive image
ChEMBL	ChEMBL3182518
ChemSpider	7969510
PubChem CID	9793743
UNII	60D96IJX3Z
CompTox Dashboard (EPA)	DTXSID6044723
- InChI: InChI=1S/C2H4O2.Al.2H2O/c1-2(3)4;;;/h1H3,(H,3,4);;2*1H2/q;+3;;/p-3 Key: KLMDYFUUSKOJAX-UHFFFAOYSA-K
- SMILES: CC(=O)[O-].[OH-].[OH-].[Al+3]

Properties
Chemical formula	(HO)_{2}AlCH_{3}CO_{2} or C_{2}H_{5}AlO_{4}
Molar mass	120.04 g/mol
Appearance	White powder
- Except where otherwise noted, data are given for materials in their standard state (at 25 °C [77 °F], 100 kPa). Infobox references

Aluminium monoacetate, also known as dibasic aluminium acetate, and formally named dihydroxy aluminium acetate, is a salt of aluminium with acetic acid. It has the formula Al(OH)_{2}(CH_{3}COO), with aluminium in an oxidation state of +3, and appears under standard conditions as a white solid powder.

== Chemistry ==
Aluminium monoacetate is prepared from the reaction between Al(OH)_{3} and dilute aqueous acetic acid. It is also formed from the successive hydrolysis of aluminium triacetate.

Al(CH_{3}COO)_{3} + H_{2}O → Al(OH)(CH_{3}COO)_{2} + CH_{3}COOH
Al(OH)(CH_{3}COO)_{2} + H_{2}O → Al(OH)_{2}(CH_{3}COO) + CH_{3}COOH

== Uses ==
Aluminium monoacetate is a dermatological agent used as an antiseptic and astringent. It is used as an antiseptic to reduce the possibility of infection in minor wounds, cuts, and burns. Specifically, it treats itching, stinging of the infected skin, inflammation, and it promotes healing. It also can be used as a topical astringent to help shrink the body's tissues when applied to the skin as it acts as a protective layer on irritated and inflamed skin.
