= Ludwig Wilhelm Sachs =

Ludwig Wilhelm Sachs (29 December 1787 in Groß-Glogau – 17 June 1848 in Königsberg) was a German medical doctor.

From 1807 studied medicine at the universities of Königsberg, Berlin and Göttingen, receiving his doctorate at the latter institution with the dissertation-thesis "De Humorum corporis animalis vi vitali" (1812). He later served as a physician in war-time hospitals in Königsberg, and in 1816 obtained his habilitation. In 1818 he became an associate professor at Königsberg, followed by a full professorship in 1826. In 1832 he was named director of the medical clinic, then in 1840 received the title of Geheimen Medizinalrat (private medical advisor).

== Published works ==
- Ueber Wissen und Gewissen. Reden an Aerzte, 1826 – On knowledge and belief.
- Versuche zu einem Schlußworte über S. Hahnemann’s homöopathisches System, nebst einigen Conjecturen, 1826 – Essay on Samuel Hahnemann's homeopathic system, together with some conjectures.
- Handwörterbuch der practischen Arzneimittellehre; with Friedrich Philipp Dulk (3 volumes, 1830–39) – Handbook of practical materia medica.
- Die China und die Krankheiten, welche sie heilt, 1831.
- Das Quecksilber: ein pharmakologisch-therapeutischer Versuch, 1834 – On quicksilver; a pharmacological-therapeutic experiment.
- Das Opium: ein pharmacologisch-therapeutischer Versuch, 1836 – On opium; a pharmacological-therapeutic experiment.
- "Spiritual wives"; William Hepworth Dixon (2 volumes, 1868 in English) with Sachs' Darstellung der pietistischen Umtriebe in Königsberg (Representation of pietistic machinations in Königsberg).
