= Ebonising =

Wood darkening process

Ebonising is a process for darkening wood, giving it an appearance similar to ebony, hence the name.

It is particularly used for pianos and fine furniture.

== History ==
While little record exists of who invented ebonizing, it was popular among the upper classes throughout the Early Modern period, especially when ebony was scarce. In the 19th century, ebonizing became popular as ebony was no longer nearly plentiful enough to feed demand for the new mass market furniture.

== Processes ==
One process uses iron dissolved in vinegar as the darkening agent. The ferric acetate thus formed reacts with the tannin in the wood, forming a black substance crusting the top of the wood. Since hardwoods have higher tannin content, they are more convenient woods to ebonize. However, softwoods can be ebonized by soaking them with tea (which has a high tannin content) and then applying the solution.
