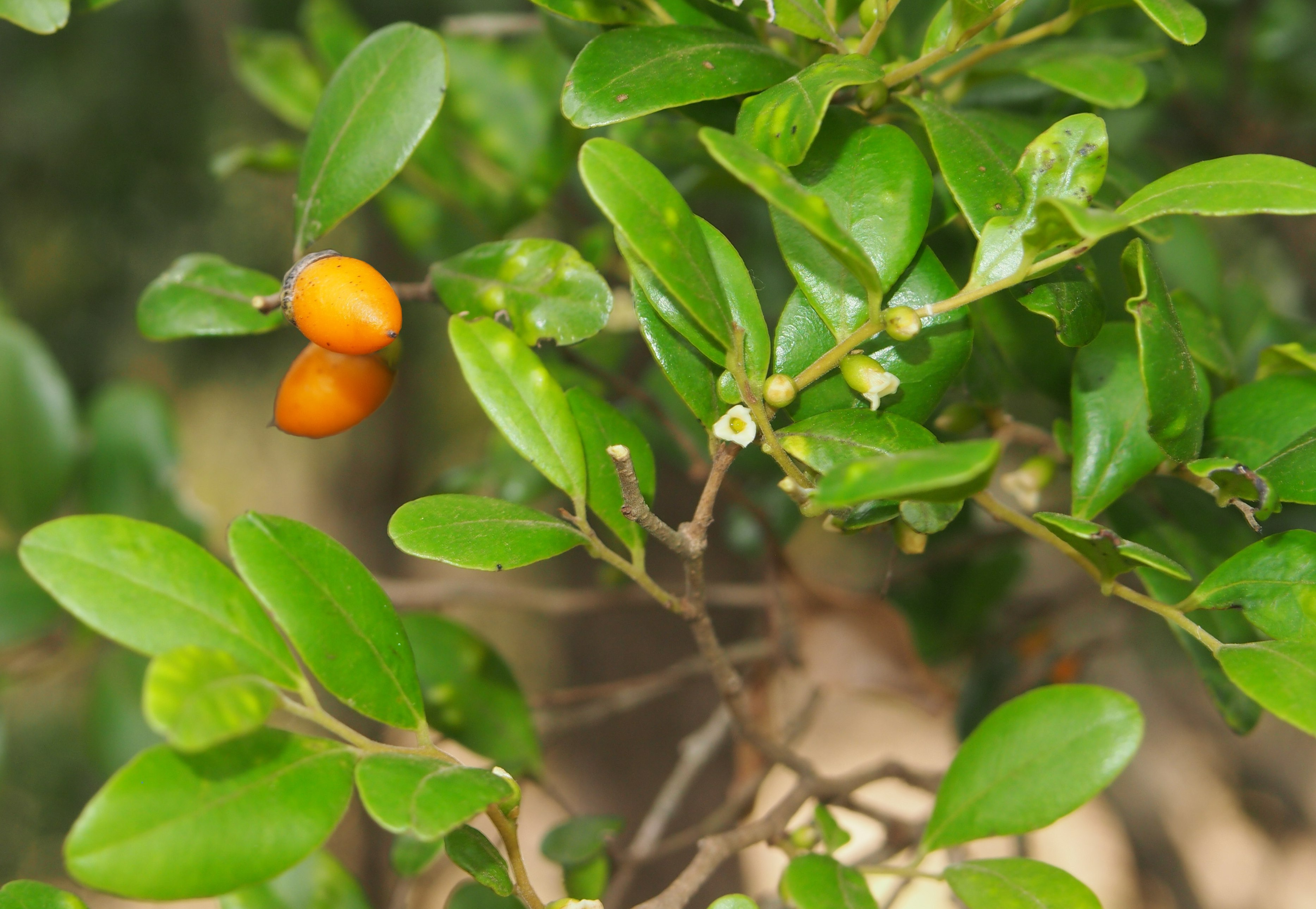

Conservation status
- Least Concern (IUCN 3.1)

Scientific classification
- Kingdom: Plantae
- Clade: Tracheophytes
- Clade: Angiosperms
- Clade: Eudicots
- Clade: Asterids
- Order: Ericales
- Family: Ebenaceae
- Genus: Diospyros
- Species: D. humilis

Binomial name
- Diospyros humilis (R.Br.) F.Muell.

= Diospyros humilis =

Species of tree

Diospyros humilis, commonly named Queensland ebony or Australian ebony, is a small eastern Australian tree found throughout Queensland and extending into Northern New South Wales and the Northern Territory. The plant is most commonly found in coastal and semi-arid zones in vine scrubs, brigalow woodlands and other locales with infrequent fire.

The plant grows as a small tree or shrub, with stiff, glossy, discolorous leaves. Foliage is held in distinctive trusses and shrubs developing tree form, can be distinctly pyramidal in profile. Fruit are oval and bright yellow and orange-red when ripe with a single seed.

The timber is prized for woodturning and fine cabinet work.

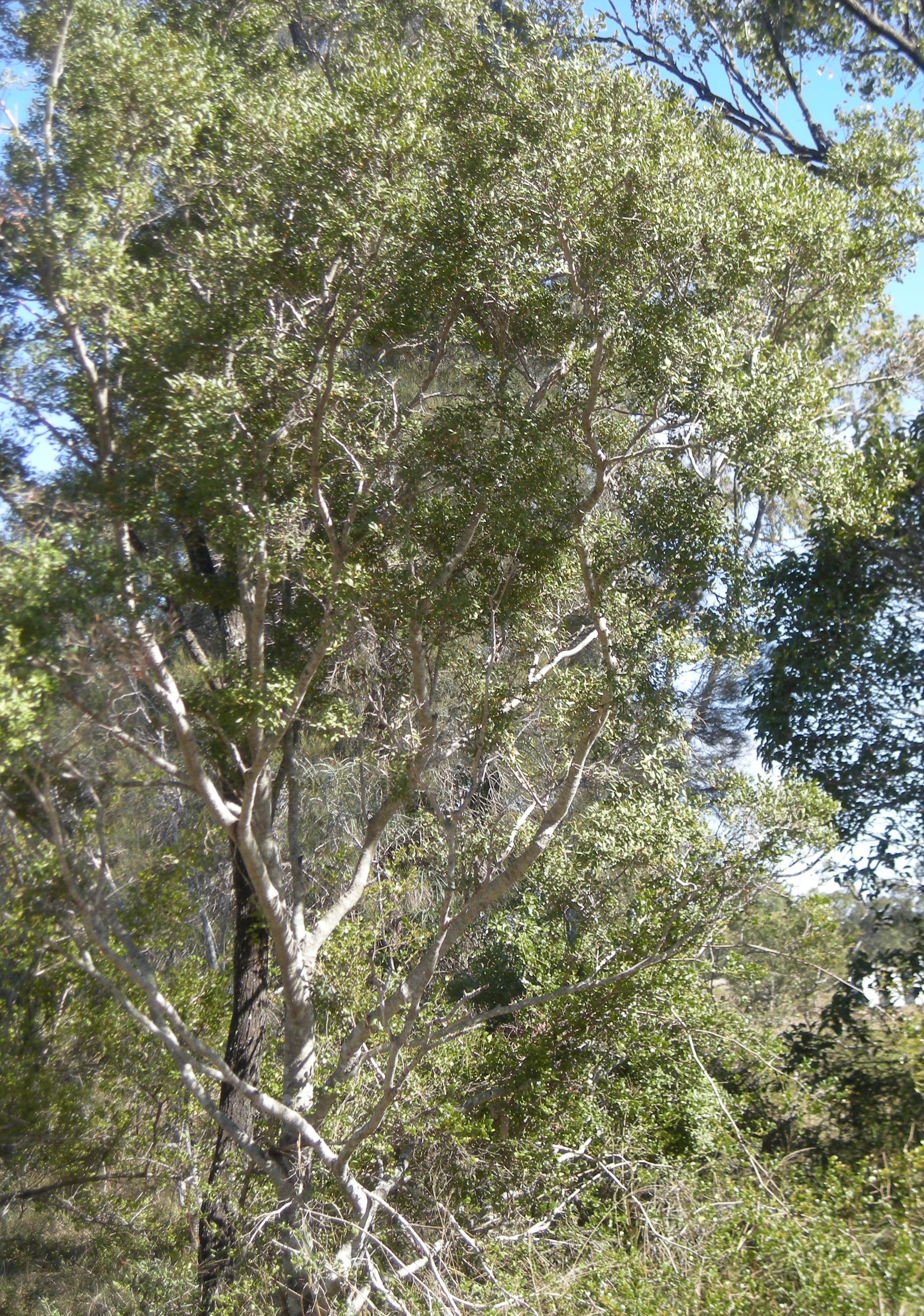
D. humilis coastal Central Queensland.
