= Aluminium formate =

Names
- IUPAC name Aluminium triformate

Identifiers
CAS Number	7360-53-4
3D model (JSmol)	Interactive image
ChemSpider	56385
ECHA InfoCard	100.028.089
PubChem CID	62632
UNII	0D34IG724V
CompTox Dashboard (EPA)	DTXSID1044724
- InChI: InChI=1S/3CH2O2.Al/c3*2-1-3;/h3*1H,(H,2,3);/q;;;+3/p-3 Key: MJWPFSQVORELDX-UHFFFAOYSA-K; InChI=1/3CH2O2.Al/c3*2-1-3;/h3*1H,(H,2,3);/q;;;+3/p-3 Key: MJWPFSQVORELDX-DFZHHIFOAF
- SMILES: [Al+3].[O-]C=O.[O-]C=O.[O-]C=O

Properties
Chemical formula	C_{3}H_{3}AlO_{6}
Molar mass	162.033 g·mol^{−1}
Appearance	White powder
Solubility in water	Insoluble
- Except where otherwise noted, data are given for materials in their standard state (at 25 °C [77 °F], 100 kPa). Infobox references

Aluminium formate is the aluminium salt of formic acid, with the chemical formula Al(HCOO)_{3}. It can be produced via the reaction of aluminium soaps and formic acid. Reaction between formic acid and aluminium hydroxide yields Al(HCOO)_{3}(CO_{2})_{0.75}(H_{2}O)_{0.25}(HCOOH)_{0.25}. Upon activation at 180 °C, guest molecules are removed to obtain Al(HCOO)_{3}.
