= Burow's solution =

Astringent and antibacterial treatment

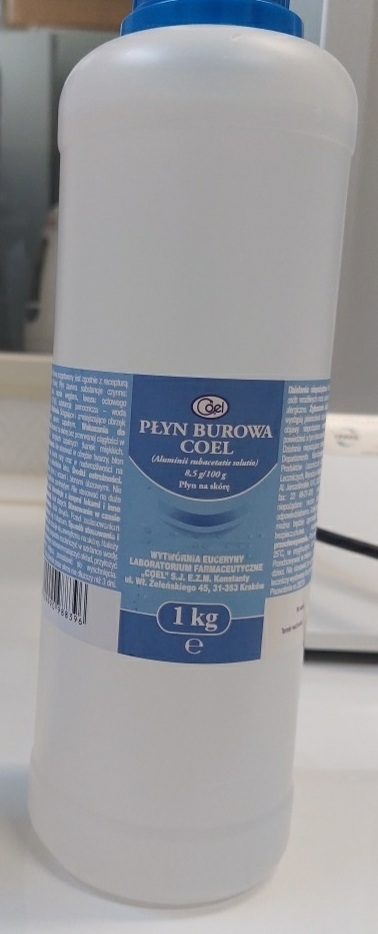
Burow’s solution

Burow's solution is an aqueous solution of aluminium triacetate. It is available in the U.S.A. as an over-the-counter drug for topical administration, with under the brand name Domeboro (Moberg Pharma). The preparation has astringent and antibacterial properties and may be used to treat a number of skin conditions, including insect bites and stings, rashes caused by poison ivy and poison sumac, swelling, allergies, and bruises. However, its main use is for treatment of otitis (ear infection), including otomycosis (fungal ear infection). Rarely, cases have been reported of temporary hearing loss if used to treat otitis when the eardrum is perforated.

== History ==
The creator of Burow's solution was Karl August Burow (1809-1874), a military surgeon and anatomist. Burow was also the inventor of some plastic surgery and wound healing techniques which are still in wide use today.

== Use ==
=== Otitis ===
Burow's solution may be used to treat various forms of ear infections, known as otitis. As a drug it is inexpensive and non-ototoxic. In cases of otomycosis it is less effective than clotrimazole but remains an effective treatment.

Burrow's solution was formerly available over the counter in the United States in ear-drop form under the brand names Domeboro Otic, Star-Otic, and Borofair, and routinely used on US Naval vessels. Domeboro Otic is no longer available, Borofair is prescription-only, and Star-Otic was reformulated with the brand name being reused for a different compound. Burrow's solution ear drops are as of 2025 available in the United States as a prescription item, NDC 24208-615-77, manufactured by Bausch & Lomb's Vaeleant Pharmaceuticals division.

=== Skin irritation ===
Most versions of Burow's solution can be used as a soak or compress. As an FDA approved astringent it is used for the relief of skin irritations due to poison ivy, poison oak, and poison sumac, and rashes from allergic reactions to soaps, detergents, cosmetics and jewelry. This is due to the combination of two active ingredients found in this version of Burow's solution, i.e. aluminum sulfate tetradecahydrate and calcium acetate monohydrate.

The solution is used by some to reduce inflammation and potential infection from conditions such as ingrown nails, in a warm water soak.

== See also ==
- Urushiol
- Urushiol-induced contact dermatitis
- Anti-itch drug
