= Cheiloplasty =

Surgical procedure

- Specialty: Plastic surgery

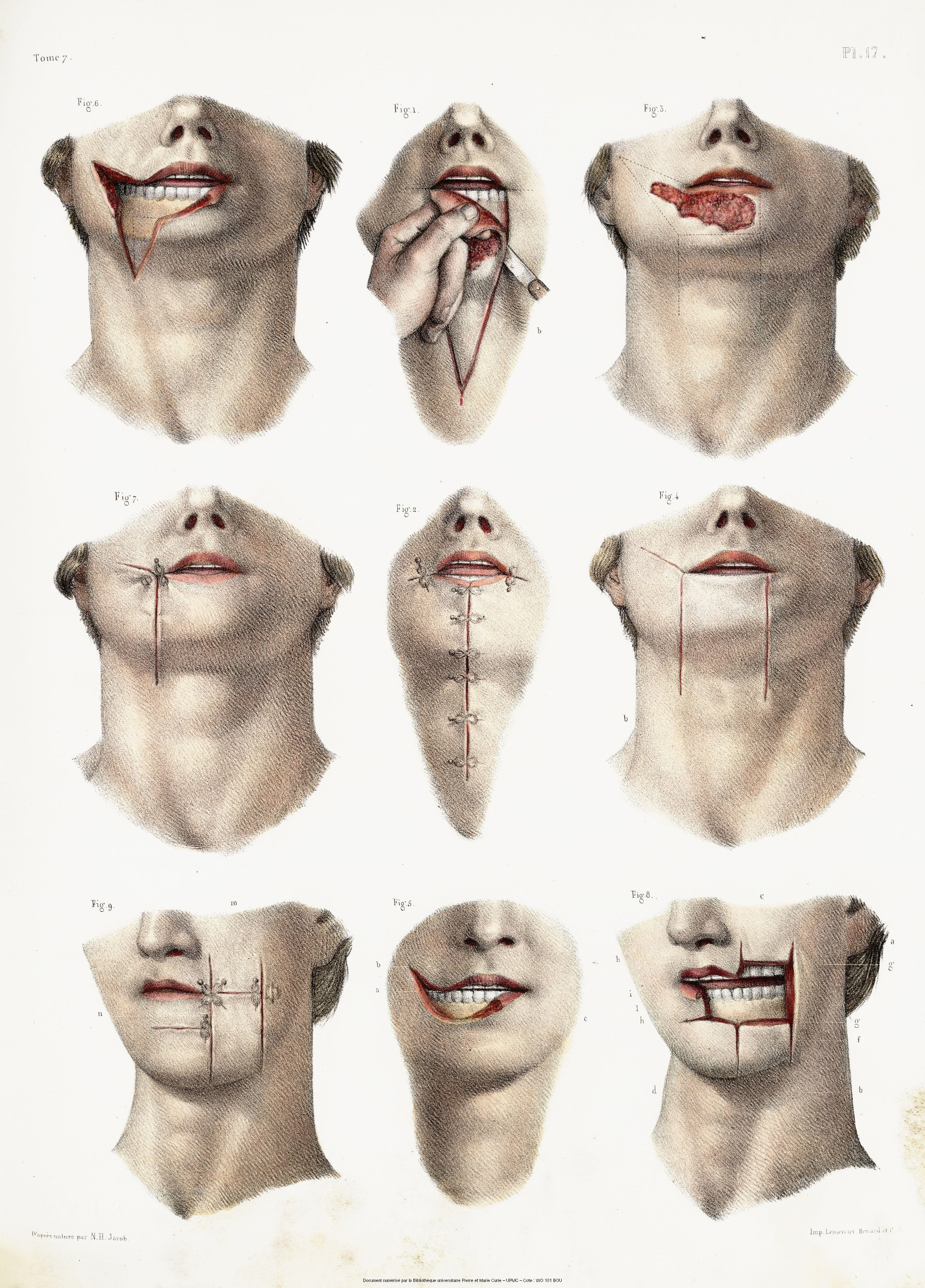
Cheiloplasty, 19th century.

Cheiloplasty or surgical lip restoration (from Greek: χείλος kheilos – "lip") is the technical term for surgery of the lip usually performed by a plastic surgeon or oral and maxillofacial surgeon. Among other procedures it includes lip reduction, the process of surgically reducing the size of the lip or lips to reduce the appearance of abnormally large or protruding lips, as well as the process of forming an artificial tip or part of the lips by using a piece of healthy tissue from some neighboring part. The procedure can also larger.

Cheiloplasty can be performed to treat tight lip syndrome in Shar Pei dogs by repositioning the lower lip and allowing it to heal in a normal position.
