= Digital dermatitis =

Bacterial disease of cattle

Digital dermatitis is a disease that causes lameness in cattle. It was first discovered in Italy in 1974 by Cheli and Mortellaro. This disease is caused by a mixture of different bacteria. Anaerobic bacteria, including spirochetes of the genus Treponema, are found in the lesions associated with the infection. Digital dermatitis is different from foot rot in cattle and both conditions may occur concurrently.

Digital dermatitis primarily affects dairy cattle and has been known to lower the quantity of milk produced, but the quality of the milk is unaffected.

Evidence shows that risk factors favouring digital dermatitis outbreaks include: poor hygiene and high humidity; introduction of infected animals; no hoof care for heifers and dry cows; high levels of chronically infected animals; insufficient or inadequate hoof trimming; soft hooves and unbalanced nutrition.

== Presentation ==
Digital dermatitis appears as lesions which initially looks like a raw, red, oval ulcer on the back of the heel. These lesions develop raised, hair-like projections or wart-like lesions, and some may extend up between the claws or appear on the front of the foot.

== Cause ==
Digital dermatitis is a polymicrobial disease involving treponemes and other anaerobes. Treponemes are the bacterium most commonly found in lesions. Their abundance increases as the lesion progresses. They account for 94% of bacterial sequences detected in chronic lesions.

== Diagnosis ==
A scoring system was developed to classify the different stages of digital dermatitis, the M-stages system, where "M" stands for Mortellaro. The different stages are described as: M0, healthy skin; M1, early stage, skin defect < 2 cm diameter; M2, acute active ulcerative lesion; M3, healing stage, lesion covered with scab-like material; M4, chronic stage, that may be dyskeratotic (mostly thickened epithelium) or proliferative or both.

Diagnosis is principally based on history and clinical signs. It is very rare that attempts are made to isolate the bacteria.

== Treatment ==
Treatment of lesions of digital dermatitis is done by topical application of agents to the affected skin. The skin should be cleaned and kept dry prior to treatment. Topical oxytetracycline (OTC) is often referred as the most reliable treatment as cows treated with OTC have a good recovery rate. Bandaging the lesion is often undertaken but there is no evidence of any benefit and bandaging can provide the anaerobic environment which supports the spirochaetes. Systemic antibiotics are not needed.

Control and prevention of digital dermatitis relies on prompt detection, isolation and treatment of affected cattle. Group hoof disinfection can be achieved via the passage of the cows through footbaths of antimicrobial solutions. Slurry build-up should be avoided since organic matter can impair the antimicrobial efficacy of the footbath solutions. Regular footbaths should be organised, using formalin, copper sulphate or a thymol-based disinfectant. While regular footbathing can help prevent hoof infections, occasional flare-up of active M2 lesions can happen.

Copper sulfate footbaths are one of the most common forms of protection and treatment for digital dermatitis thanks to its antimicrobial trait and its ability to harden hooves to prevent exposure to bacteria. Copper sulfate is more effective as a prevention method rather than a treatment for digital dermatitis.

== Synonyms ==
- Hairy heel warts
- Strawberry foot rot
- Mortellaro disease
- Italian foot rot
- Papillomatous digital dermatitis (caused by Treponema spirochetes)
