= Iron(III) acetate =

Names
- IUPAC name iron(III) acetate
- Other names: Basic iron(III) acetate; Iron(III) oxyacetate; Iron(III) Acetate

Identifiers
3D model (JSmol)	Interactive image; coordination complex: Interactive image
- InChI: InChI=1S/C2H4O2.6C2H3O2.3Fe.3H2O.O/c7*1-2(3)4;;;;;;;/h1H3,(H,3,4);6*1H3;;;;3*1H2;/q;6*-3;3*+7;;;;-2/p-1 Key: PKFAFRBTLSPJHP-UHFFFAOYSA-M
- SMILES: O1[C-](C)O[Fe+3]6([O-2]23)([OH2])(O[C-](C)O4)O[C-](C)O[Fe+3]24([OH2])(O[C-](C)O5)O[C-](C)O[Fe+3]135([OH2])O[C-](C)O6.[O-]C(C)=O; coordination complex: O1[C-](C)O[Fe+3]6([O-2]23)([OH2])(O[C-](C)O4)O[C-](C)O[Fe+3]24([OH2])(O[C-](C)O5)O[C-](C)O[Fe+3]135([OH2])O[C-](C)O6

Properties
Chemical formula	C_{14}H_{27}Fe_{3}O_{18}
Molar mass	650.9 g/mol
Appearance	brownish-red powder
Solubility in water	Insoluble
Solubility	soluble in ethanol

Related compounds
Other cations	Iron(II) acetate; Cobalt(II) acetate; Rhodium(II) acetate
- Except where otherwise noted, data are given for materials in their standard state (at 25 °C [77 °F], 100 kPa). Infobox references

Ferric acetate is the iron compound with the formula [Fe_{3}O(CH_{3}CO_{2})_{6}(H_{2}O)_{3}]CH_{3}CO_{2}. This red brown solid is the acetate salt of the coordination complex [Fe_{3}O(OAc)_{6}(H_{2}O)_{3}]^{+} (OAc^{−} is CH_{3}CO_{2}^{−}). Commonly, the salt is known as "basic iron acetate". The formation of the red-brown complex was once used as a test for ferric ions.

== Structure and synthesis ==
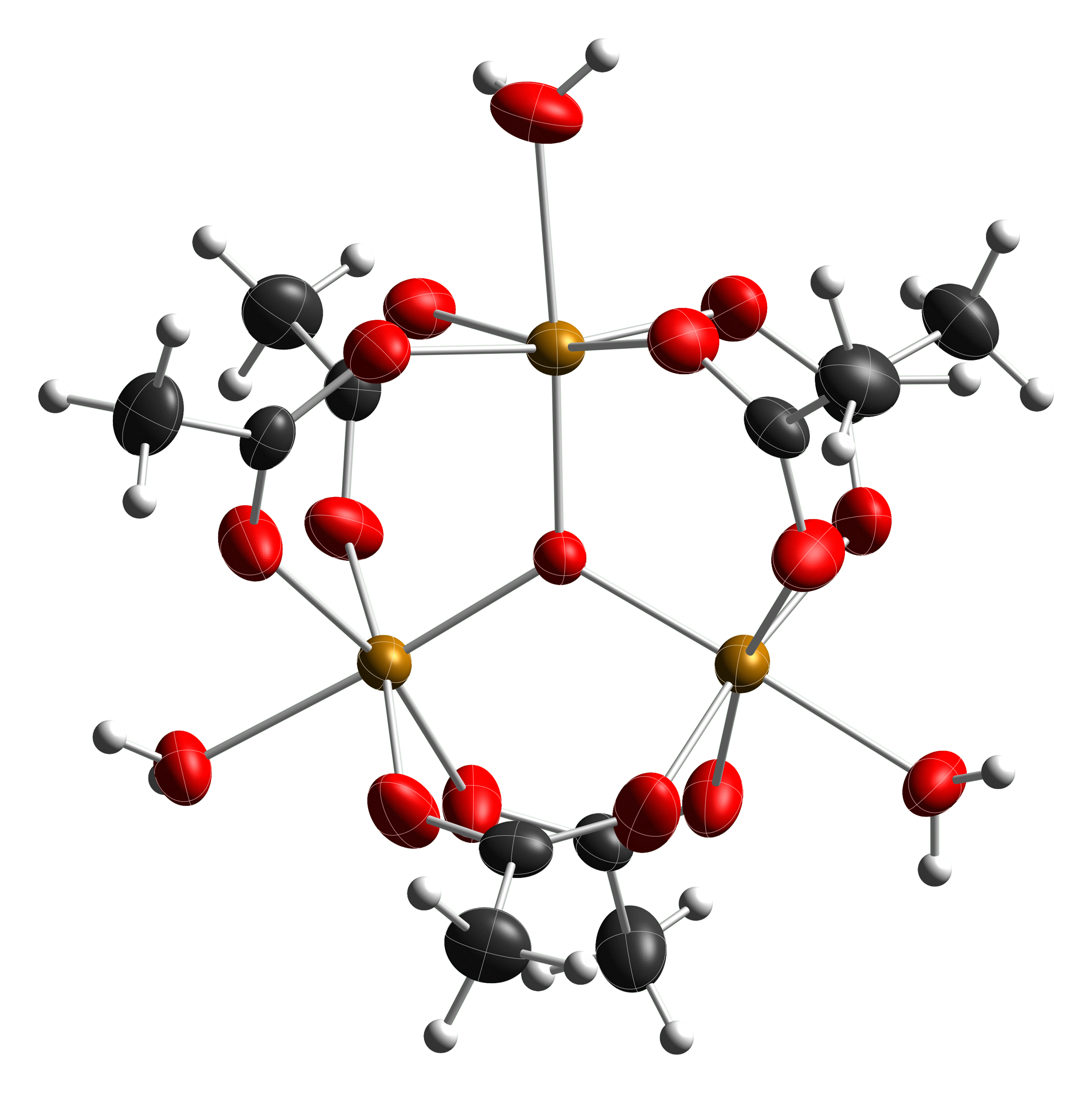
structure of the cation called basic iron acetate as determined from X-ray crystallography

Basic iron acetate forms on treating aqueous solutions of iron(III) sources with acetate salts. It is slowly soluble in water and poorly soluble in acetic acid. A typical precursor is freshly precipitated iron oxide/hydroxide, which is halide-free.

Early work showed that the cation is trinuclear. The Fe centres are equivalent, each being octahedral, being bound to six oxygen ligands, including a triply bridging oxide at the center of the equilateral triangle. The compound was an early example of a molecular complex of iron that features an oxide ligand. The cation has idealized D_{3h} symmetry.

== Uses ==
Materials prepared by heating iron, acetic acid, and air, loosely described as basic iron acetates, are used as dyes and mordants.

Iron acetate is used in ebonising, which is a process for darkening wood, giving it an appearance similar to ebony.

== Reactions ==
The terminal aqua ligands on the trimetallic framework can be substituted with other ligands, such as pyridine and dimethylformamide. Many different salts are known by exchanging the anion, e.g. [Fe_{3}(μ_{3}-O)(OAc)_{6}(H_{2}O)_{3}]Cl. Reduction of the cation affords the neutral mixed-valence derivative that contains one ferrous and two ferric centers. Mixed metal species are known such as [Fe_{2}CoO(OAc)_{6}(H_{2}O)_{3}].

== Related compounds ==
Chromium(III), ruthenium(III), vanadium(III), manganese(III) and rhodium(III) form analogous compounds. Iron(III) acetate (lacking the oxo ligand) has been claimed as a red coloured compound from the reaction of silver acetate and iron(III) chloride.
