= Aluminium diacetate =

- Skeletal formula of aluminium diacetate

Names
- IUPAC name Aluminium diacetate

Identifiers
CAS Number	142-03-0
3D model (JSmol)	Interactive image; Interactive image
ChemSpider	21106083
ECHA InfoCard	100.005.017
PubChem CID	10197832
UNII	FGL8577C9S
CompTox Dashboard (EPA)	DTXSID7044552
- InChI: InChI=1S/2C2H4O2.Al.H2O/c2*1-2(3)4;;/h2*1H3,(H,3,4);;1H2/q;;+3;/p-3 Key: HQQUTGFAWJNQIP-UHFFFAOYSA-K; InChI=1/2C2H4O2.Al.H2O/c2*1-2(3)4;;/h2*1H3,(H,3,4);;1H2/q;;+3;/p-3/rC4H7AlO5/c1-3(6)9-5(8)10-4(2)7/h8H,1-2H3 Key: HQQUTGFAWJNQIP-JQTRRPLUAZ
- SMILES: CC(=O)O[Al](O)OC(C)=O; O[Al](OC(C)=O)OC(C)=O

Properties
Chemical formula	C_{4}H_{7}AlO_{5}
Molar mass	162.077 g·mol^{−1}
Appearance	White, opaque crystals

Hazards
- Occupational safety and health (OHS/OSH)
Main hazards	Causes irritation to skin and eye
NFPA 704 (fire diamond)	1 1 1
- Except where otherwise noted, data are given for materials in their standard state (at 25 °C [77 °F], 100 kPa). verify (what is ?) Infobox references

Aluminium diacetate, also known as basic aluminium acetate, is a white powder with the chemical formula C_{4}H_{7}AlO_{5}. It is one of a number of aluminium acetates and can be prepared in a reaction of sodium aluminate (NaAlO_{2}) with acetic acid.

== Medicinal use ==
Aluminium diacetate is used as an antiseptic and astringent. It is used topically as wet dressing, compress, or soak for self-medication to temporarily relieve itching and soothe, particularly on wet or weeping lesions. It relieves skin irritation from many causes, such as insect bites, athlete's foot, urushiol-induced contact dermatitis from plants poisonous to the touch such as poison ivy, oak, or sumac, and skin irritation due to sensitivity to soaps, detergents, cosmetics, or jewellery. It is also used to relieve swelling from bruises. Preparations are also used topically for the relief of a variety skin conditions such as eczema, diaper rash, acne, and pruritus ani. It is typically used in the form of Burow's solution, 13% of AlAc in water. In the USA medications containing aluminium acetate are sold under the brand names Domeboro Powder, Gordon's Boro-Packs, and Pedi-Boro Soak Paks. It is sold in gel form under the name TriCalm.

Acetic acid/aluminium acetate solution can be used medicinally to treat infections in the outer ear canal. This medication stops the growth of the bacteria and fungus and beneficially dries out the ear canal. US preparations for this purpose include Domeboro Otic, Star-Otic, and Borofair.

== Mordant ==
In the dyeing industry, basic aluminium diacetate is used in combination with aluminium triacetate as a mordant for fibres like cotton.
