= Iron(II) acetate =

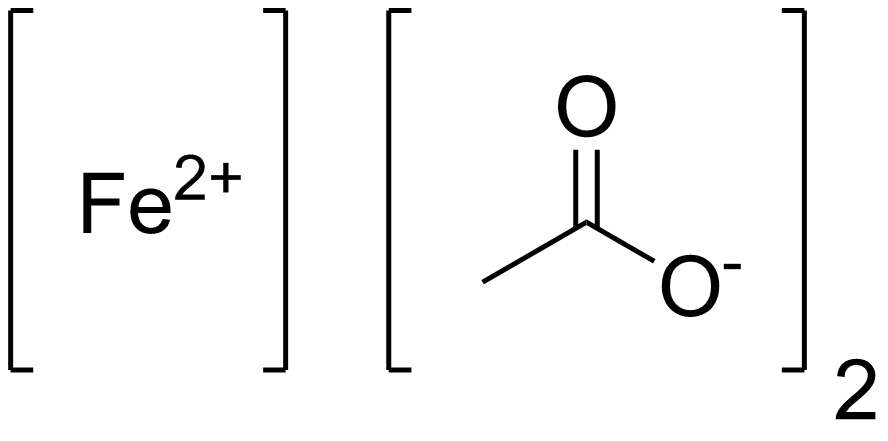
- Skeletal formula of iron(II) acetate

Names
- IUPAC name Iron(II) acetate
- Other names Ferrous acetate

Identifiers
CAS Number	3094-87-9; 19807-28-4 tetrahydrate
3D model (JSmol)	coordination form: Interactive image; ionic form: Interactive image
ChemSpider	17323
ECHA InfoCard	100.019.492
PubChem CID	18344
RTECS number	AI3850000
UNII	L80I7M6D3Q
CompTox Dashboard (EPA)	DTXSID5037656
- InChI: InChI=1S/2C2H4O2.Fe/c2*1-2(3)4;/h2*1H3,(H,3,4);/q;;+2/p-2 Key: LNOZJRCUHSPCDZ-UHFFFAOYSA-L; InChI=1/2C2H4O2.Fe/c2*1-2(3)4;/h2*1H3,(H,3,4);/q;;+2/p-2 Key: LNOZJRCUHSPCDZ-NUQVWONBAS
- SMILES: coordination form: CC(O1)O[Fe]12OC(O2)C; ionic form: CC(=O)[O-].[Fe+2].CC(=O)[O-]

Properties
Chemical formula	C_{4}H_{6}FeO_{4}
Molar mass	173.933 g·mol^{−1}
Appearance	White crystals (anhydrous); Light green crystals (tetrahydrate)
Odor	Odorless
Density	1.734 g/cm^{3} (−73 °C)
Melting point	190–200 °C (374–392 °F; 463–473 K) decomposes
Solubility in water	Soluble

Structure
Crystal structure	Orthorhombic, oP75 (200 K)
Space group	Pbcn, No. 60 (200 K)
Point group	2/m 2/m 2/m (200 K)
Lattice constant	a = 18.1715(4) Å, b = 22.1453(5) Å, c = 8.2781(2) Å (200 K) α = 90°, β = 90°, γ = 90°

Hazards
- GHS labelling
Pictograms	(GHS07: Exclamation mark)
Signal word	Warning
Hazard statements	H315, H319, H335
Precautionary statements	P261, P305+P351+P338
NFPA 704 (fire diamond)	2 0 0
- Except where otherwise noted, data are given for materials in their standard state (at 25 °C [77 °F], 100 kPa). verify (what is ?) Infobox references

Iron(II) acetate describes compounds with formula Fe(CH_{3}CO_{2})_{2}·(H_{2}O)_{x} where x can be 0 (anhydrous) or 4 (tetrahydrate). The anhydrous compound is a white solid, although impure samples can be slightly colored. The tetrahydrate is a crystalline solid that is moderately soluble in water.

== Structure ==
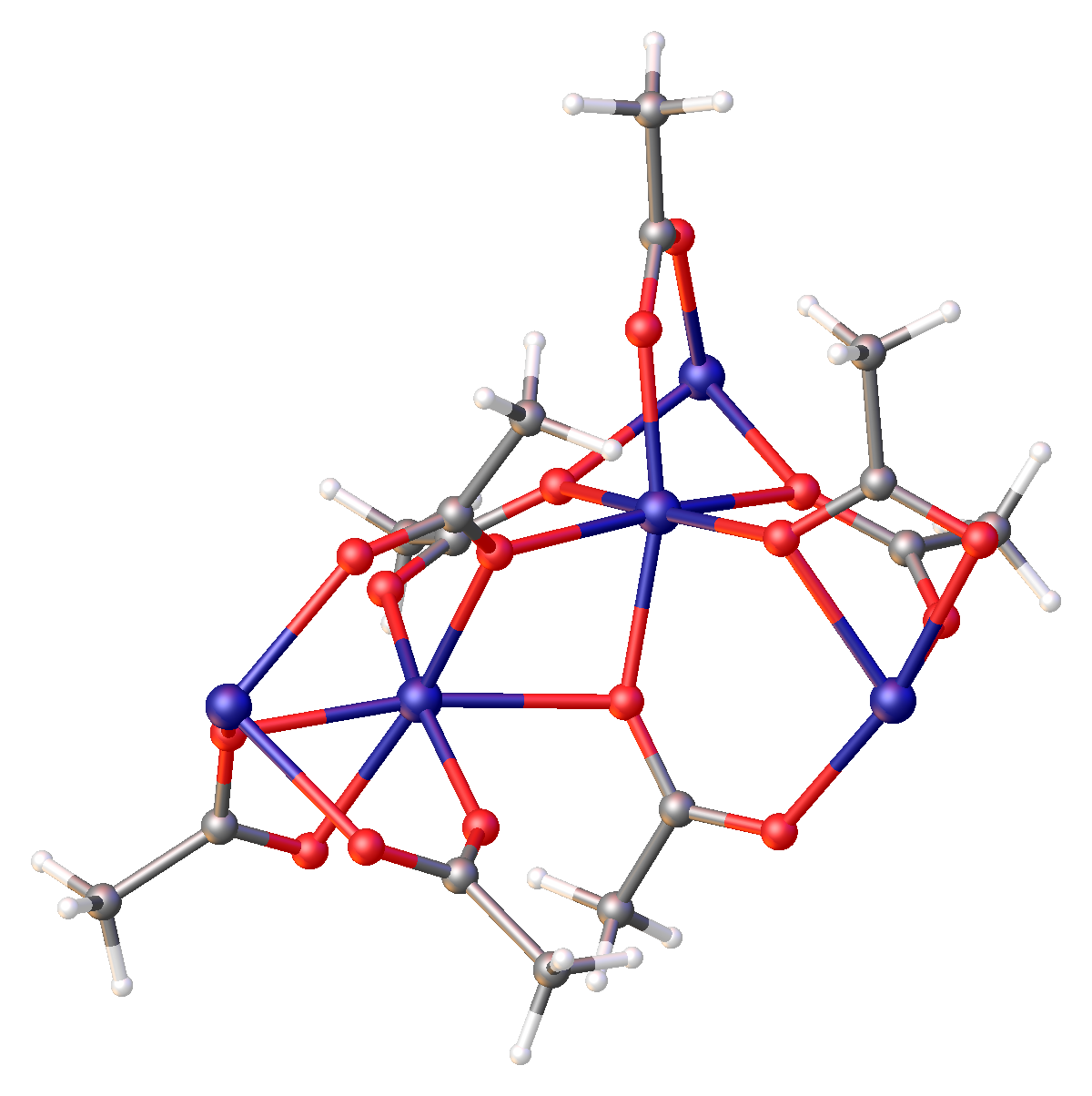
Although anhydrous ferrous acetate can be viewed as a simple salt, X-ray crystallography reveals a complicated polymeric structure. Color code: red = O, blue = Fe, gray = C, white = H.

Iron(II) acetate adopts a polymeric structure with octahedral Fe(II) centers interconnected by acetate ligands. It is a coordination polymer.

== Preparation ==
Iron powder reacts with acetic acid to give the ferrous acetate, with evolution of hydrogen gas:

Fe + 2 CH_{3}CO_{2}H → Fe(CH_{3}CO_{2})_{2} + H_{2}

Reaction of scrap iron with acetic acid affords a brown mixture of various iron(II) and iron(III) acetates that are used in dyeing.

It can also be made from the insoluble, olive green, Iron(II) carbonate.

== Uses ==
Ferrous acetate is used as a mordant by the dye industry. Ebonizing wood is one such process.
