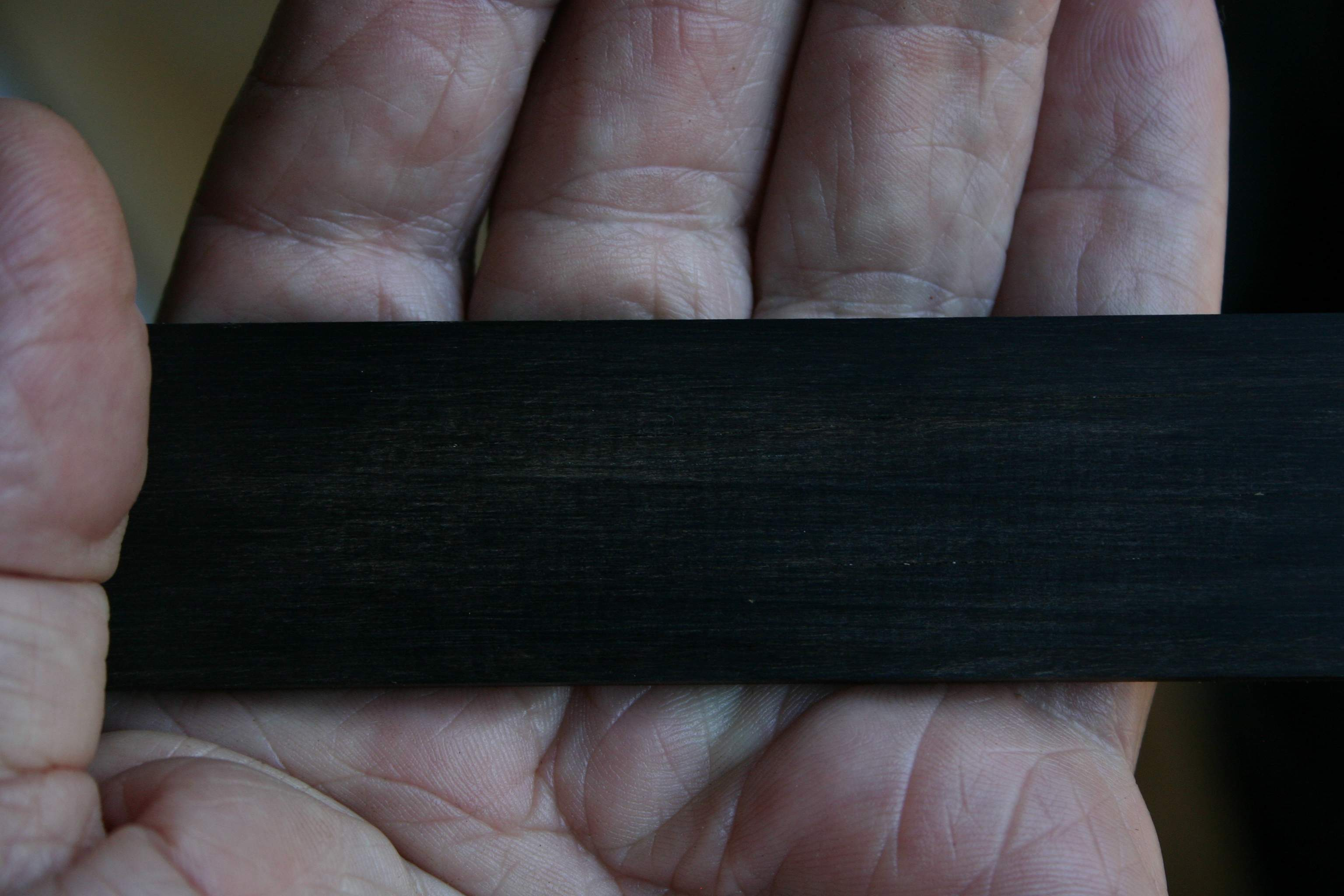

Conservation status
- Vulnerable (IUCN 3.1)

Scientific classification
- Kingdom: Plantae
- Clade: Tracheophytes
- Clade: Angiosperms
- Clade: Eudicots
- Clade: Asterids
- Order: Ericales
- Family: Ebenaceae
- Genus: Diospyros
- Species: D. crassiflora

Binomial name
- Diospyros crassiflora Hiern

Synonyms
- Diospyros ampullacea Gürke; Diospyros evila Pierre ex A.Chev.; Diospyros incarnata Gürke

= Diospyros crassiflora =

Species of tree

Diospyros crassiflora, commonly known as Gaboon ebony, African ebony, Cameroon ebony, Nigeria ebony, West African ebony, and Benin ebony is a species of lowland-rainforest tree in the family Ebenaceae that is endemic to Western Africa. It is named after the Central African nation of Gabon, though it also occurs in Cameroon, Central African Republic, Republic of the Congo, Democratic Republic of the Congo, Equatorial Guinea and Nigeria.

The wood this particular tree produces is believed to be the blackest of all timber-producing Diospyros species, and the heartwood from this tree has been used since ancient Egyptian times. It is hard and durable with very fine pores, and it polishes to a high luster. It is used to make sculptures, carvings, walking sticks, pool cues, doorknobs, tool and knife handles, gun grips, the black keys on pianos, organ-stops, guitar fingerboards and bridges, and chess pieces. It is the wood of choice for the fingerboards, tailpieces, and tuning pegs used on all orchestral stringed instruments, including violins, violas, cellos, and double basses.

The species was classified as endangered on the International Union for Conservation of Nature red list in 1998. A second IUCN assessment in 2018 re-listed the species as vulnerable. The new assessment was based on a more detailed dataset of occurrence and abundance. It stated that "the most severe long-term threat is the conversion of forest to agriculture and grazing, as well as logging of other commercial timber species."
