= Timeline of physical chemistry =

The timeline of physical chemistry lists the sequence of physical chemistry theories and discoveries in chronological order.

== Timeline details ==
Date	Person	Contribution
1088	Shen Kuo	First person to write of the magnetic needle compass and that it improved the accuracy of navigation by helping to employ the astronomical concept of True North at all times of the day, thus making the first, recorded, scientific observation of the magnetic field (as opposed to a theory grounded in superstition or mysticism).
1187	Alexander Neckham	First in Europe to describe the magnetic compass and its use in navigation.
1269	Pierre de Maricourt	Published the first extant treatise on the properties of magnetism and compass needles.
1550	Gerolamo Cardano	Wrote about electricity in De Subtilitate distinguishing, perhaps for the first time, between electrical and magnetic forces.
1600	William Gilbert	In De Magnete, expanded on Cardano's work (1550) and coined the New Latin word electricus from ἤλεκτρον (elektron), the Greek word for "amber" (from which the ancients knew an electric spark could be created by rubbing it with silk). Gilbert undertook a number of careful electrical experiments, in the course of which he discovered that many substances other than amber, such as sulphur, wax, glass, etc., were capable of manifesting electrostatic properties. Gilbert also discovered that a heated body lost its electricity and that moisture prevented the electrification of all bodies, due to the now well-known fact that moisture impairs the electrical insulation of such bodies. He also noticed that electrified substances attracted all other substances indiscriminately, whereas a magnet only attracted iron. The many discoveries of this nature earned for Gilbert the title of founder of the electrical sciences.
1646	Sir Thomas Browne	The first usage of the word electricity is ascribed to his work Pseudodoxia Epidemica.
1660	Otto von Guericke	Invented an early electrostatic generator. By the end of the 17th Century, researchers had developed practical means of generating electricity by friction by the use of an electrostatic generator, but the development of electrostatic machines did not begin in earnest until the 18th century, when they became fundamental instruments in the studies of the new science of electricity.
1667	Johann Joachim Becher	Stated the now-defunct scientific theory that postulated the existence of a fire-like element called "phlogiston" that was contained within combustible bodies and released during combustion. The theory was an attempt to explain processes such as combustion and the rusting of metals, which are now understood as oxidation, and which was ultimately disproved by Antoine Lavoisier in 1789.
1675	Robert Boyle	Discovered that electric attraction and repulsion can act across a vacuum and does not depend upon the air as a medium. He also added resin to the then-known list of "electrics".
1678	Christiaan Huygens	Stated his theory to the French Academy of Sciences that light is a wave-like phenomenon.
1687	Sir Isaac Newton	Published Philosophiæ Naturalis Principia Mathematica, by itself considered to be among the most influential books in the history of science, laying the groundwork for most of classical mechanics. In this work, Newton described universal gravitation and the three laws of motion, which dominated the scientific view of the physical universe for the next three centuries. Newton showed that the motions of objects on Earth and of celestial bodies are governed by the same set of natural laws by demonstrating the consistency between Kepler's laws of planetary motion and his theory of gravitation, thus removing the last doubts about heliocentrism and advancing the Scientific Revolution. In mechanics, Newton enunciated the principles of conservation of both momentum and angular momentum. (Eventually, it was determined that Newton's laws of classical mechanics were a limiting case of the more general theory of quantum mechanics for macroscopic objects (in the same way that Newton's laws of motion are a limiting case of Einstein's Theory of Relativity).)
1704	Sir Isaac Newton	In his work Opticks, Newton contended that light was made up of numerous small particles. This hypothesis could explain such features as light's ability to travel in straight lines and reflect off surfaces. However, this proposed theory was known to have its problems: although it explained reflection well, its explanation of refraction and diffraction was less satisfactory. In order to explain refraction, Newton postulated an "Aethereal Medium" transmitting vibrations faster than light, by which light, when overtaken, is put into "Fits of easy Reflexion and easy Transmission", which he supposed caused the phenomena of refraction and diffraction.
1708	Brook Taylor	Obtained a remarkable solution of the problem of the "centre of oscillation" fundamental to the development of wave mechanics which, however, remained unpublished until May 1714.
1715	Brook Taylor	In Methodus Incrementorum Directa et Inversa (1715), he added a new branch to the higher mathematics, now designated the "calculus of finite differences". Among other ingenious applications, he used it to determine the form of movement of a vibrating string, first successfully reduced by him to mechanical principles. The same work contained the celebrated formula known as Taylor's theorem, the importance of which remained unrecognized until 1772, when J. L. Lagrange realized its powers and termed it "le principal fondement du calcul différentiel" ("the main foundation of differential calculus"). Taylor's work thereby provided the cornerstone of the calculus of wave mechanics.
1722	René Antoine Ferchault de Réaumur	Demonstrated that iron was transformed into steel through the absorption of some substance, now known to be carbon.
1729	Stephen Gray	Conducted a series of experiments that demonstrated the difference between conductors and non-conductors (insulators). From these experiments he classified substances into two categories: "electrics", like glass, resin and silk, and "non-electrics", like metal and water. Although Gray was the first to discover and deduce the property of electrical conduction, he incorrectly stated that "electrics" conducted charges while "non-electrics" held the charge.
1732	C. F. du Fay	Conducted several experiments and concluded that all objects, except metals, animals, and liquids, could be electrified by rubbing them and that metals, animals and liquids could be electrified by means of an "electric machine" (the name used at the time for electrostatic generators), thus discrediting Gray's "electrics" and "non-electrics" classification of substances (1729).
1737	C. F. du Fay and Francis Hauksbee the younger	Independently discovered what they believed to be two kinds of frictional electricity: one generated from rubbing glass, the other from rubbing resin. From this, Du Fay theorized that electricity consists of two "electrical fluids": "vitreous" and "resinous", that are separated by friction, and that neutralize each other when combined. This two-fluid theory would later give rise to the concept of positive and negative electrical charges devised by Benjamin Franklin.
1740	Jean le Rond d'Alembert	In Mémoire sur la réfraction des corps solides, explains the process of refraction.
1740s	Leonhard Euler	Disagreed with Newton's corpuscular theory of light in the Opticks, which was then the prevailing theory. His 1740s papers on optics helped ensure that the wave theory of light proposed by Christiaan Huygens would become the dominant mode of thought, at least until the development of the quantum theory of light.
1745	Pieter van Musschenbroek	At Leiden University, he invented the Leyden jar, a type of capacitor (also known as a "condensor") for electrical energy in large quantities.
1747	William Watson	While experimenting with a Leyden jar (1745), he discovered the concept of an electrical potential (voltage) when he observed that a discharge of static electricity caused the electric current earlier observed by Stephen Gray to occur.
1752	Benjamin Franklin	Identified lightning with electricity when he discovered that lightning conducted through a metal key could be used to charge a Leyden jar, thus proving that lightning was an electric discharge and current (1747). He is also attributed with the convention of using "negative" and "positive" to denote an electrical charge or potential.
1766	Henry Cavendish	The first to recognize hydrogen gas as a discrete substance, by identifying the gas from a metal–acid reaction as "flammable air" and further finding in 1781 that the gas produces water when burned.
1771	Luigi Galvani	Invented the voltaic cell. Galvani made this discovery when he noted that two different metals (copper and zinc for example) were connected together and then both touched to different parts of a nerve of a frog leg at the same time, a spark was generated which made the leg contract. Although he incorrectly assumed that the electric current was proceeding from the frog as some kind of "animal electricity", his invention of the voltaic cell was fundamental to the development of the electric battery.
1772	Antoine Lavoisier	Showed that diamonds are a form of carbon, when he burned samples of carbon and diamond then showed that neither produced any water and that both released the same amount of carbon dioxide per gram.
1772	Carl Wilhelm Scheele	Showed that graphite, which had been thought of as a form of lead, was instead a type of carbon.
1772	Daniel Rutherford	Discovered and studied nitrogen, calling it noxious air or fixed air because this gas constituted a fraction of air that did not support combustion. Nitrogen was also studied at about the same time by Carl Wilhelm Scheele, Henry Cavendish, and Joseph Priestley, who referred to it as burnt air or phlogisticated air. Nitrogen gas was inert enough that Antoine Lavoisier referred to it as "mephitic air" or azote, from the Greek word άζωτος (azotos) meaning "lifeless". Animals died in it, and it was the principal component of air in which animals had suffocated and flames had burned to extinction.
1772	Carl Wilhelm Scheele	Produced oxygen gas by heating mercuric oxide and various nitrates by about 1772. Scheele called the gas 'fire air' because it was the only known supporter of combustion, and wrote an account of this discovery in a manuscript he titled Treatise on Air and Fire, which he sent to his publisher in 1775. However, that document was not published until 1777.
1778	Carl Scheele and Antoine Lavoisier	Discovered that air is composed mostly of nitrogen and oxygen.
1781	Joseph Priestley	The first to utilize the electric spark to produce an explosion of hydrogen and oxygen, mixed in the proper proportions, to produce pure water.
1784	Henry Cavendish	Discovered the inductive capacity of dielectrics (insulators) and, as early as 1778, measured the specific inductive capacity for beeswax and other substances by comparison with an air condenser.
1784	Charles-Augustin de Coulomb	Devised the torsion balance, by means of which he discovered what is known as Coulomb's law: the force exerted between two small electrified bodies varies inversely as the square of the distance; not as Franz Aepinus in his theory of electricity had assumed, merely inversely as the distance.
1788	Joseph-Louis Lagrange	Stated a re-formulation of classical mechanics that combines conservation of momentum with conservation of energy, now called Lagrangian mechanics, and which would be critical to the later development of a quantum mechanical theory of matter and energy.
1789	Antoine Lavoisier	In his text Traité Élémentaire de Chimie (often considered to be the first modern chemistry text), stated the first version of the law of conservation of mass, recognized and named oxygen (1778) and hydrogen (1783), abolished the phlogiston theory, helped construct the metric system, wrote the first extensive list of elements, and helped to reform chemical nomenclature.
1798	Louis Nicolas Vauquelin	In 1797 received samples of crocoite ore from which he produced chromium oxide (CrO3) by mixing crocoite with hydrochloric acid. In 1798, Vauquelin discovered that he could isolate metallic chromium by heating the oxide in a charcoal oven. He was also able to detect traces of chromium in precious gemstones, such as ruby or emerald.
1798	Louis Nicolas Vauquelin	Discovered beryllium in emerald (beryl) when he dissolved the beryl in sodium hydroxide, separating the aluminium hydroxide and beryllium compound from the silicate crystals, and then dissolving the aluminium hydroxide in another alkali solution to separate it from the beryllium.
1800	William Nicholson and Johann Ritter	Used electricity to decompose water into hydrogen and oxygen, thereby discovering the process of electrolysis, which led to the discovery of many other elements.
1800	Alessandro Volta	Invented the voltaic pile, or "battery", specifically to disprove Galvani's animal electricity theory.
1801	Johann Wilhelm Ritter	Discovered ultraviolet light.
1803	Thomas Young	Double-slit experiment supports the wave theory of light and demonstrates the effect of interference.
1806	Alessandro Volta	Employing a voltaic pile of approximately 250 cells, or couples, decomposed potash and soda, showing that these substances were respectively the oxides of potassium and sodium, which metals previously had been unknown. These experiments were the beginning of electrochemistry.
1807	John Dalton	Published his Atomic Theory of Matter.
1807	Sir Humphry Davy	First isolates sodium from caustic soda and potassium from caustic potash by the process of electrolysis.
1808	Sir Humphry Davy, Joseph Louis Gay-Lussac, and Louis Jacques Thénard	Boron isolated through the reaction of boric acid and potassium.
1809	Sir Humphry Davy	First publicly demonstrated the electric arc light.
1811	Amedeo Avogadro	Proposed that the volume of a gas (at a given pressure and temperature) is proportional to the number of atoms or molecules, regardless of the nature of the gas—a key step in the development of the Atomic Theory of Matter.
1817	Johan August Arfwedson and Jöns Jakob Berzelius	Arfwedson, then working in the laboratory of Berzelius, detected the presence of a new element while analyzing petalite ore. This element formed compounds similar to those of sodium and potassium, though its carbonate and hydroxide were less soluble in water and more alkaline. Berzelius gave the alkaline material the name "lithos", from the Greek word λιθoς (transliterated as lithos, meaning "stone"), to reflect its discovery in a solid mineral, as opposed to sodium and potassium, which had been discovered in plant tissues.
1819	Hans Christian Ørsted	Discovered the deflecting effect of an electric current traversing a wire upon a suspended magnetic needle, thus deducing that magnetism and electricity were somehow related to each other.
1821	Augustin-Jean Fresnel	Demonstrated via mathematical methods that polarization could be explained only if light was entirely transverse, with no longitudinal vibration whatsoever. This finding was later very important to Maxwell's equations and to Einstein's Theory of Special Relativity. His use of two plane mirrors of metal, forming with each other an angle of nearly 180°, allowed him to avoid the diffraction effects caused (by the apertures) in the experiment of F. M. Grimaldi on interference. This allowed him to conclusively account for the phenomenon of interference in accordance with the wave theory. With François Arago he studied the laws of the interference of polarized rays. He obtained circularly polarized light by means of a rhombus of glass, known as a Fresnel rhomb, having obtuse angles of 126° and acute angles of 54°.
1821	André-Marie Ampère	Announced his celebrated theory of electrodynamics, relating the force one current exerts upon another by way of its electromagnetic effects.
1821	Thomas Johann Seebeck	Discovered the thermoelectric effect.
1827	Georg Simon Ohm	Discovered the relationship between voltage, current, and resistance, making possible the development of electric circuitry and power transmission.
1831	Macedonio Melloni	Used a thermopile to detect infrared radiation.
1831	Michael Faraday	Discovered electromagnetic induction, making possible the invention of the electric motor and generator.
1833	William Rowan Hamilton	Stated a reformulation of classical mechanics that arose from Lagrangian mechanics, a previous reformulation of classical mechanics introduced by Joseph-Louis Lagrange in 1788, but which can be formulated without recourse to Lagrangian mechanics using symplectic spaces (see Mathematical Formalism). As with Lagrangian mechanics, Hamilton's equations provide a new and equivalent way of looking at classical mechanics. Generally, these equations do not provide a more convenient way of solving a particular problem. Rather, they provide deeper insights into both the general structure of classical mechanics and its connection to quantum mechanics as understood through Hamiltonian mechanics, as well as its connection to other areas of science.
1833	Michael Faraday	Announced his important law of electrochemical equivalents, viz.: "The same quantity of electricity—that is, the same electric current—decomposes chemically equivalent quantities of all the bodies which it traverses; hence the weights of elements separated in these electrolytes are to each other as their chemical equivalents."
1834	Heinrich Lenz	Applied an extension of the law of conservation of energy to the non-conservative forces in electromagnetic induction to give the direction of the induced electromotive force (emf) and current resulting from electromagnetic induction. The law provides a physical interpretation of the choice of sign in Faraday's law of induction (1831), indicating that the induced emf and the change in flux have opposite signs.
1834	Jean-Charles Peltier	Discovered what is now called the Peltier effect: the heating effect of an electric current at the junction of two different metals.
1838	Michael Faraday	Using Volta's battery, Farraday discovered "cathode rays" when, during an experiment, he passed current through a rarefied air filled glass tube and noticed a strange light arc starting at the anode (positive electrode) and ending at the cathode (negative electrode).
1839	Alexandre Edmond Becquerel	Observed the photoelectric effect via an electrode in a conductive solution exposed to light.
1852	Edward Frankland	Initiated the theory of valency by proposing that each element has a specific "combining power", e.g. some elements such as nitrogen tend to combine with three other elements (e.g. NO_{3}) while others may tend to combine with five (e.g. PO_{5}), and that each element strives to fulfill its combining power (valency) quota.
1857	Heinrich Geissler	Invented the Geissler tube.
1858	Julius Plücker	Published the first of his classical researches on the action of magnets on the electric discharge of rarefied gases in Geissler tubes. He found that the discharge caused a fluorescent glow to form on the glass walls of the vacuum tube, and that the glow could be made to shift by applying a magnetic field to the tube. It was later shown by Johann Wilhelm Hittorf that the glow was produced by rays emitted from one of the electrodes (the cathode).
1859	Gustav Kirchhoff	Stated the "black body problem", i.e. how does the intensity of the electromagnetic radiation emitted by a black body depend on the frequency of the radiation and the temperature of the body?
1865	Johann Josef Loschmidt	Estimated the average diameter of the molecules in air by a method that is equivalent to calculating the number of particles in a given volume of gas. This latter value, the number density of particles in an ideal gas, is now called the Loschmidt constant in his honour, and is approximately proportional to the Avogadro constant. The connection with Loschmidt is the root of the symbol L sometimes used for the Avogadro constant, and German language literature may refer to both constants by the same name, distinguished only by the units of measurement.
1868	Norman Lockyer and Edward Frankland	On October 20 observed a yellow line in the solar spectrum, which he named the "D3 Fraunhofer line" because it was near the known D1 and D2 lines of sodium. He correctly concluded that it was caused by an element in the Sun unknown on Earth. Lockyer and Frankland named the element with the Greek word for the Sun, ἥλιος, "helios".
1869	Dmitri Mendeleev	Devises the Periodic Table of the Elements.
1869	Johann Wilhelm Hittorf	Studied discharge tubes with energy rays extending from a negative electrode, the cathode. These rays, which he discovered but were later called cathode rays by Eugen Goldstein, produced a fluorescence when they hit a tube's glass walls and, when interrupted by a solid object, cast a shadow.
1869	William Crookes	Invented the Crookes tube.
1873	Willoughby Smith	Discovered the photoelectric effect in metals not in solution (i.e., selenium).
1873	James Clerk Maxwell	Published his theory of electromagnetism in which light was determined to be an electromagnetic wave (field) that could be propagated in a vacuum.
1877	Ludwig Boltzmann	Suggested that the energy states of a physical system could be discrete.
1879	William Crookes	Showed that cathode rays (1838), unlike light rays, can be bent in a magnetic field.
1885	Johann Balmer	Discovered that the four visible lines of the hydrogen spectrum could be assigned integers in a series
1886	Henri Moissan	Isolated elemental fluorine after almost 74 years of effort by other chemists.
1886	Oliver Heaviside	Coined the term "inductance".
1886	Eugen Goldstein	Goldstein had undertaken his own investigations of discharge tubes and had named the light emissions studied by others "kathodenstrahlen", or cathode rays. In 1886, he discovered that discharge tubes with a perforated cathode also emit a glow at the cathode end. Goldstein concluded that in addition to the already-known cathode rays (later recognized as electrons) moving from the negatively charged cathode toward the positively charged anode, there is another ray that travels in the opposite direction. Because these latter rays passed through the holes, or channels, in the cathode, Goldstein called them "kanalstrahlen", or canal rays. He determined that canal rays are composed of positive ions whose identity depends on the residual gas inside the tube. It was another of Helmholtz's students, Wilhelm Wien, who later conducted extensive studies of canal rays, and in time this work would become part of the basis for mass spectrometry.
1887	Albert A. Michelson and Edward W. Morley	Conducted what is now called the Michelson–Morley experiment, in which they disproved the existence of a luminiferous aether and that the speed of light remained constant relative to all inertial frames of reference. The full significance of this discovery was not understood until Albert Einstein published his Theory of Special Relativity.
1887	Heinrich Hertz	Discovered the production and reception of electromagnetic (EM) radio waves. His receiver consisted of a coil with a spark gap, where a spark would be seen upon detection of EM waves transmitted from another spark gap source.
1888	Johannes Rydberg	Modified the Balmer formula to include the other series of lines, producing the Rydberg formula
1891	Alfred Werner	Proposed a theory of affinity and valence in which affinity is an attractive force issuing from the center of the atom which acts uniformly from there towards all parts of the spherical surface of the central atom.
1892	Heinrich Hertz	Showed that cathode rays (1838) could pass through thin sheets of gold foil and produce appreciable luminosity on glass behind them.
1893	Alfred Werner	Showed that the number of atoms or groups associated with a central atom (the "coordination number") is often 4 or 6; other coordination numbers up to a maximum of 8 were known, but less frequent.
1893	Victor Schumann	Discovered the vacuum ultraviolet spectrum.
1895	Sir William Ramsay	Isolated helium on Earth by treating the mineral cleveite (a variety of uraninite with at least 10% rare earth elements) with mineral acids.
1895	Wilhelm Röntgen	Discovered X-rays with the use of a Crookes tube.
1896	Henri Becquerel	Discovered "radioactivity" a process in which, due to nuclear disintegration, certain elements or isotopes spontaneously emit one of three types of energetic entities: alpha particles (positive charge), beta particles (negative charge), and gamma particles (neutral charge).
1897	J. J. Thomson	Showed that cathode rays (1838) bend under the influence of both an electric field and a magnetic field. To explain this he suggested that cathode rays are negatively charged subatomic electrical particles or "corpuscles" (electrons), stripped from the atom; and in 1904 proposed the "plum pudding model" in which atoms have a positively charged amorphous mass (pudding) as a body embedded with negatively charged electrons (raisins) scattered throughout in the form of non-random rotating rings. Thomson also calculated the mass-to-charge ratio of the electron, paving the way for the precise determination of its electrical charge by Robert Andrews Millikan (1913).
1900	Max Planck	To explain black-body radiation (1862), he suggested that electromagnetic energy could only be emitted in quantized form, i.e. the energy could only be a multiple of an elementary unit E = hν, where h is the Planck constant and ν is the frequency of the radiation.
1901	Frederick Soddy and Ernest Rutherford	Discovered nuclear transmutation when they found that radioactive thorium was converting itself into radium through a process of nuclear decay.
1902	Gilbert N. Lewis	To explain the octet rule (1893), he developed the "cubical atom" theory in which electrons in the form of dots were positioned at the corner of a cube and suggested that single, double, or triple "bonds" result when two atoms are held together by multiple pairs of electrons (one pair for each bond) located between the two atoms (1916).
1904	J. J. Thomson	Articulated the plum pudding model of the atom that was later experimentally disproved by Rutherford (1907).
1904	Richard Abegg	Noted the pattern that the numerical difference between the maximum positive valence, such as +6 for H_{2}SO_{4}, and the maximum negative valence, such as −2 for H_{2}S, of an element tends to be eight (Abegg's rule).
1905	Albert Einstein	Determined the equivalence of matter and energy.
1905	Albert Einstein	First to explain the effects of Brownian motion as caused by the kinetic energy (i.e., movement) of atoms, which was subsequently, experimentally verified by Jean Baptiste Perrin, thereby settling the century-long dispute about the validity of John Dalton's atomic theory.
1905	Albert Einstein	Published his Special Theory of Relativity.
1905	Albert Einstein	Explained the photoelectric effect (1839), i.e. that shining light on certain materials can function to eject electrons from the material, he postulated as based on Planck's quantum hypothesis (1900), that light itself consists of individual quantum particles (photons).
1907	Ernest Rutherford	To test the plum pudding model (1904), he fired positively charged alpha particles at gold foil and noticed that some bounced back, thus showing that atoms have a small-sized positively charged atomic nucleus at its center.
1909	Geoffrey Ingram Taylor	Demonstrated that interference patterns of light were generated even when the light energy introduced consisted of only one photon. This discovery of the wave–particle duality of matter and energy was fundamental to the later development of quantum field theory.
1909 and 1916	Albert Einstein	Showed that, if Planck's law of black-body radiation is accepted, the energy quanta must also carry momentum p = h / λ, making them fully fledged particles, albeit with no "rest mass".
1911	Lise Meitner and Otto Hahn	Performed an experiment that showed that the energies of electrons emitted by beta decay had a continuous rather than discrete spectrum. This was in apparent contradiction to the law of conservation of energy, as it appeared that energy was lost in the beta decay process. A second problem was that the spin of the nitrogen-14 atom was 1, in contradiction to the Rutherford prediction of 1/2. These anomalies were later explained by the discoveries of the neutrino and the neutron.
1912	Henri Poincaré	Published an influential mathematical argument in support of the essential nature of energy quanta.
1913	Robert Andrews Millikan	Publishes the results of his "oil drop" experiment, in which he precisely determines the electric charge of the electron. Determination of the fundamental unit of electric charge made it possible to calculate the Avogadro constant (which is the number of atoms or molecules in one mole of any substance) and thereby to determine the atomic weight of the atoms of each element.
1913	Niels Bohr	To explain the Rydberg formula (1888), which correctly modeled the light emission spectra of atomic hydrogen, Bohr hypothesized that negatively charged electrons revolve around a positively charged nucleus at certain fixed "quantum" distances and that each of these "spherical orbits" has a specific energy associated with it such that electron movements between orbits requires "quantum" emissions or absorptions of energy.
1911	Ștefan Procopiu	Performed experiments in which he determined the correct value of electron's magnetic dipole moment, μ_{B} = 9.27×10^{−21} erg⋅Oe^{−1}.
1916	Gilbert N. Lewis	Developed the Lewis dot structures that ultimately led to a complete understanding of the electronic covalent bond that forms the fundamental basis for our understanding of chemistry at the atomic level; he also coined the term "photon" in 1926.
1916	Arnold Sommerfeld	To account for the Zeeman effect (1896), i.e. that atomic absorption or emission spectral lines change when the light is first shone through a magnetic field, he suggested there might be "elliptical orbits" in atoms in addition to spherical orbits.
1918	Ernest Rutherford	Noticed that, when alpha particles were shot into nitrogen gas, his scintillation detectors showed the signatures of hydrogen nuclei. Rutherford determined that the only place this hydrogen could have come from was the nitrogen, and therefore nitrogen must contain hydrogen nuclei. He thus suggested that the hydrogen nucleus, which was known to have an atomic number of 1, was an elementary particle, which he decided must be the protons hypothesized by Eugen Goldstein (1886).
1919	Irving Langmuir	Building on the work of Lewis (1916), he coined the term "covalence" and postulated that coordinate covalent bonds occur when the electrons of a pair come from the same atom, thus explaining the fundamental nature of chemical bonding and molecular chemistry.
1922	Arthur Compton	Found that X-ray wavelengths increase due to scattering of the radiant energy by "free electrons". The scattered quanta have less energy than the quanta of the original ray. This discovery, now known as the "Compton effect" or "Compton scattering", demonstrates the "particle" concept of electromagnetic radiation.
1922	Otto Stern and Walther Gerlach	Stern–Gerlach experiment detects discrete values of angular momentum for atoms in the ground state passing through an inhomogeneous magnetic field leading to the discovery of the spin of the electron.
1923	Louis de Broglie	Postulated that electrons in motion are associated with waves the lengths of which are given by the Planck constant h divided by the momentum mv = p of the electron: λ = h / mv = h / p.
1924	Satyendra Nath Bose	His work on quantum mechanics provides the foundation for Bose–Einstein statistics, the theory of the Bose–Einstein condensate, and the discovery of the boson.
1925	Friedrich Hund	Outlined the "rule of maximum multiplicity" which states that, when electrons are added successively to an atom, as many levels or orbits are singly occupied as possible before any pairing of electrons with opposite spin occurs, and also made the distinction that the inner electrons in molecules remain in their atomic orbitals and only the valence electrons need occupy the molecular orbitals involving both nuclei of the atoms participating in a covalent bond.
1925	Werner Heisenberg	Developed the matrix mechanics formulation of quantum mechanics.
1925	Wolfgang Pauli	Outlined the "Pauli exclusion principle" which states that no two identical fermions may occupy the same quantum state simultaneously.
1926	Gilbert Lewis	Coined the term photon, which he derived from the Greek word for light, φως (transliterated phôs).
1926	Erwin Schrödinger	Used De Broglie's electron wave postulate (1924) to develop a "wave equation" that represents mathematically the distribution of a charge of an electron distributed through space, being spherically symmetric or prominent in certain directions, i.e. directed valence bonds, which gave the correct values for spectral lines of the hydrogen atom.
1927	Charles Drummond Ellis (along with James Chadwick and colleagues)	Finally established clearly that the beta decay spectrum is really continuous, ending all controversies.
1927	Walter Heitler	Used Schrödinger's wave equation (1926) to show how two hydrogen atom wavefunctions join together, with plus, minus, and exchange terms, to form a covalent bond.
1927	Robert Mulliken	In 1927 Mulliken worked, in coordination with Hund, to develop a molecular orbital theory where electrons are assigned to states that extend over an entire molecule and in 1932 introduced many new molecular orbital terminologies, such as σ bond, π bond, and δ bond.
1928	Paul Dirac	In the Dirac equations, Paul Dirac integrated the principle of special relativity with quantum electrodynamics and thereby hypothesized the existence of the positron.
1928	Linus Pauling	Outlined the nature of the chemical bond in which he used Heitler's quantum mechanical covalent bond model (1927) to describe the quantum mechanical basis for all types of molecular structure and bonding, thereby suggesting that different types of bonds in molecules can become equalized by the rapid shifting of electrons, a process called "resonance" (1931), such that resonance hybrids contain contributions from the different possible electronic configurations.
1929	John Lennard-Jones	Introduced the linear combination of atomic orbitals approximation for the calculation of molecular orbitals.
1930	Wolfgang Pauli	In a famous letter written by him, Pauli suggested that, in addition to electrons and protons, atoms also contained an extremely light neutral particle which he called the "neutron". He suggested that this "neutron" was also emitted during beta decay and had simply not yet been observed. Later it was determined that this particle was actually the almost massless neutrino.
1931	Walther Bothe and Herbert Becker	Found that, if the very energetic alpha particles emitted from polonium fell on certain light elements, specifically beryllium, boron, or lithium, an unusually penetrating radiation was produced. At first this radiation was thought to be gamma radiation, although it was more penetrating than any gamma rays known, and the details of experimental results were very difficult to interpret on this basis. Some scientists began to hypothesize the possible existence of another fundamental, atomic particle.
1932	Irène Joliot-Curie and Frédéric Joliot	Showed that if the unknown radiation generated by alpha particles fell on paraffin or any other hydrogen-containing compound, it ejected protons of very high energy. This was not in itself inconsistent with the proposed gamma ray nature of the new radiation, but detailed quantitative analysis of the data became increasingly difficult to reconcile with such a hypothesis.
1932	James Chadwick	Performed a series of experiments showing that the gamma ray hypothesis for the unknown radiation produced by alpha particles was untenable, and that the new particles must be the neutrons hypothesized by Enrico Fermi. Chadwick suggested that, in fact, the new radiation consisted of uncharged particles of approximately the same mass as the proton, and he performed a series of experiments verifying his suggestion.
1932	Werner Heisenberg	Applied perturbation theory to the two-electron problem and showed how resonance arising from electron exchange could explain exchange forces.
1932	Mark Oliphant	Building upon the nuclear transmutation experiments of Ernest Rutherford done a few years earlier, fusion of light nuclei (hydrogen isotopes) was first observed by Oliphant in 1932. The steps of the main cycle of nuclear fusion in stars were subsequently worked out by Hans Bethe throughout the remainder of that decade.
1932	Carl D. Anderson	Experimentally proves the existence of the positron.
1933	Leó Szilárd	First theorized the concept of a nuclear chain reaction. He filed a patent for his idea of a simple nuclear reactor the following year.
1934	Enrico Fermi	Studies the effects of bombarding uranium isotopes with neutrons.
1934	N. N. Semyonov	Develops the total quantitative chain chemical reaction theory. The idea of the chain reaction, developed by Semyonov, is the basis of various high technologies using the incineration of gas mixtures. The idea was also used for the description of the nuclear reaction.
1935	Hideki Yukawa	Published his hypothesis of the Yukawa Potential and predicted the existence of the pion, stating that such a potential arises from the exchange of a massive scalar field, such as would be found in the field of the pion. Prior to Yukawa's paper, it was believed that the scalar fields of the fundamental forces necessitated massless particles.
1936	Carl D. Anderson	Discovered muons while studying cosmic radiation.
1937	Carl Anderson	Experimentally proved the existence of the pion.
1938	Charles Coulson	Made the first accurate calculation of a molecular orbital wavefunction with the hydrogen molecule.
1938	Otto Hahn, Fritz Strassmann, Lise Meitner, and Otto Robert Frisch	Hahn and Strassmann sent a manuscript to Naturwissenschaften reporting they had detected the element barium after bombarding uranium with neutrons. Simultaneously, they communicated these results to Meitner. Meitner, and her nephew Frisch, correctly interpreted these results as being nuclear fission. Frisch confirmed this experimentally on 13 January 1939.
1939	Leó Szilárd and Enrico Fermi	Discovered neutron multiplication in uranium, proving that a chain reaction was indeed possible.
1942	Kan-Chang Wang	First proposed the use of beta capture to experimentally detect neutrinos.
1942	Enrico Fermi	Created the first artificial self-sustaining nuclear chain reaction, called Chicago Pile-1 (CP-1), in a racquets court below the bleachers of Stagg Field at the University of Chicago on December 2, 1942.
1945	Manhattan Project	First nuclear fission explosion.
1947	G. D. Rochester and C. C. Butler	Published two cloud chamber photographs of cosmic ray-induced events, one showing what appeared to be a neutral particle decaying into two charged pions, and one which appeared to be a charged particle decaying into a charged pion and something neutral. The estimated mass of the new particles was very rough, about half a proton's mass. More examples of these "V-particles" were slow in coming, and they were soon given the name kaons.
1948	Sin-Itiro Tomonaga and Julian Schwinger	Independently introduced perturbative renormalization as a method of correcting the original Lagrangian of a quantum field theory so as to eliminate an infinite series of counterterms that would otherwise result.
1951	Clemens C. J. Roothaan and George G. Hall	Derived the Roothaan–Hall equations, putting rigorous molecular orbital methods on a firm basis.
1952	Manhattan Project	First explosion of a thermonuclear bomb.
1952	Herbert S. Gutowsky	Physical chemistry of solids investigated by NMR: structure, spectroscopy and relaxation
1952	Charles P. Slichter	Introduced Chemical shifts, NQR in solids, the first NOE experiments
1952	Albert W. Overhauser	First investigation of dynamic polarization in solids/NOE-Nuclear Overhauser Effect
1953	Charles H. Townes (collaborating with James P. Gordon, and Herbert J. Zeiger)	Built and reported the first ammonia maser; received a Nobel prize in 1964 for his experimental success in producing coherent radiation by atoms and molecules.
1958–1959	Edward Raymond Andrew, A. Bradbury, and R. G. Eades; and independently, I. J. Lowe	Described the technique of magic-angle spinning.
1956	P. Kuroda	Predicted that self-sustaining nuclear chain reactions should occur in natural uranium deposits.
1956	Clyde L. Cowan and Frederick Reines	Experimentally proved the existence of the neutrino.
1957	William Alfred Fowler, Margaret Burbidge, Geoffrey Burbidge, and Fred Hoyle	In their 1957 paper Synthesis of the Elements in Stars, they explained how the abundances of essentially all but the lightest chemical elements could be explained by the process of nucleosynthesis in stars.
1961	Claus Jönsson	Performed Young's double-slit experiment (1909) for the first time with particles other than photons by using electrons and with similar results, confirming that massive particles also behaved according to the wave–particle duality that is a fundamental principle of quantum field theory.
1974	Pier Giorgio Merli	Performed Young's double-slit experiment (1909) using a single electron with similar results, confirming the existence of quantum fields for massive particles.
1995	Eric Cornell, Carl Wieman and Wolfgang Ketterle	The first "pure" Bose–Einstein condensate was created by Eric Cornell, Carl Wieman, and co-workers at JILA. They did this by cooling a dilute vapor consisting of approximately two thousand rubidium-87 atoms to below 170 nK using a combination of laser cooling and magnetic evaporative cooling. About four months later, an independent effort led by Wolfgang Ketterle at MIT created a condensate made of sodium-23. Ketterle's condensate had about a hundred times more atoms, allowing him to obtain several important results such as the observation of quantum mechanical interference between two different condensates.

== See also ==
- Timeline of physics
- Timeline of atomic and subatomic physics
- Timeline of chemistry
