= Main group organometallic chemistry =

Structure of [Cp*Al]_{4}, a main group organometallic compound.

Main group organometallic chemistry concerns the preparation and properties of main-group elements directly bonded to carbon. The inventory is large. The compounds exhibit a wide range of properties, including ones that are water-stable and others that are pyrophoric. Many are very useful themselves, as chemical reagents, or as catalysts.

== Classification and structure ==
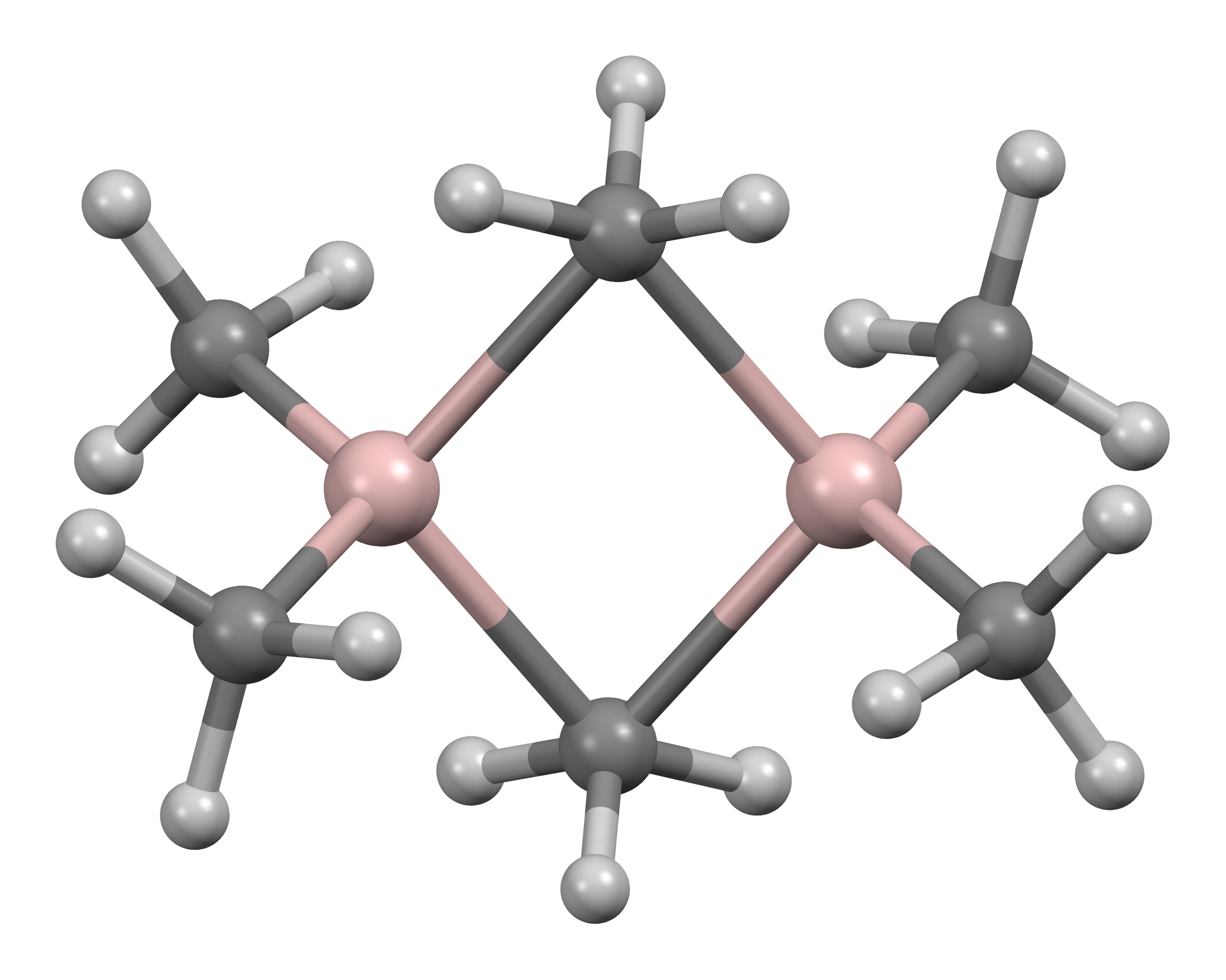
Structure of trimethylaluminium, a compound that features a bridging alkyl group.

Main group organometallic chemistry are typically categorized according to their position in the periodic table. Another possible classification scheme organizes these compounds according to the nature of the organic substituent: alkyls, aryls, vinyls, etc.

Most homoleptic organo-main group compounds adopt a characteristic oxidation state: RLi, R_{2}Be, R_{3}B/R_{3}Al, R_{4}Si, R_{3}P, R_{2}S. Members where the simplest stoichiometry violates the octet rule often aggregate by formation of bridging alkyl groups. When the alkyl group bridges two main group elements, the bonding is called three-center two-electron bonds. This pattern is seen for dimethyl beryllium and trimethylaluminium. In the case of methyl lithium, the methyl group can be shared (bonded to) three Li centers. These bonding aspects influence the structures: Trimethylaluminium, dimethyl beryllium, and methyl lithium are dimers, polymers, and clusters, respectively.

Academic research often seeks exceptions to conventional stoichiometries and oxidation states, often by use of bulky ligands. Examples include (pentamethylcyclopentadienyl)aluminium(I) (Al(I)), stannylenes (Sn(II)), and diphosphenes (P(I)).

== Reactivity ==
Thus organic derivatives of the electropositive alkali metals and alkaline earth metals tend to be highly reactive toward electrophiles, e.g. oxygen and water. Organic derivatives of the less electropositive main group elements are often robust.

Like their derivatives lacking organic substituents, halides and alkoxide ligands for the later organomain group compounds tend to hydrolyze. Organophosphorus and silanes exhibit this pattern:

R_{3}SiCl + H_{2}O → R_{3}SiOH + HCl
R_{2}PCl + H_{2}O → R_{2}POH + HCl

== Applications ==
Consisting of the terrestrially most abundant elements, main group organometallic compounds have many and often large-scale uses. Commercially important examples include:

- siloxanes, which are used as coatings, surfactants, and caulks.
- alkyl lithium compounds, which are used as initiators of polymerization reactions (i.e. the polymerization of low cis polybutadiene) and as reagents
- ethyl aluminum chlorides are important in catalyzing polymer production, as in Ziegler Natta catalyst
- tertiary phosphines, which are used as ligands in homogeneous catalysis.

== History ==
Main group organometallic chemistry is sometimes thought to start with publications on the organoarsenic compound called "Cadet's fuming liquid". This derivative of dimethylarsine is easily prepared and hence the subject of an early discovery. A major development was the popularization of Salvarsan, another organoarsenic compound at the beginning of the 1910s. Although ultimately a failed therapeutic, its use ushered in the field of chemotherapy.

An early step in main group organometallic chemistry (if one considers Zn to be a main group element) involved the synthesis of organozinc compounds diethyl zinc by Frankland.

Tetraethyllead is the focus of an infamous episode involving main group organometallic compounds. It was widely used as a fuel additive for much of the 20th century, until it was found to be chronic toxin.
