= Alexander Gutbier =

German chemist

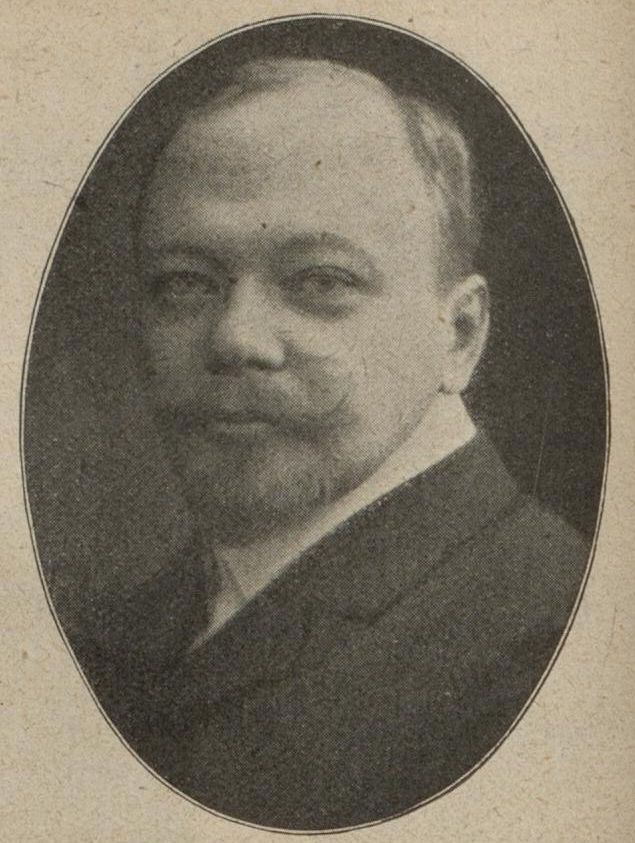
Image of Alexander Gutbier

Alexander Felix Maximilian Gutbier (21 March 1876 – 4 October 1926) was a German professor of chemistry at the University of Jena. He made studies both in organic and inorganic chemistry but pioneered studies on the chemistry of colloid and organo-metallic complexes. Specializing mainly in experimental chemistry, he published several texts on organic chemistry.

== Biography ==
Gutbier was the son of factory owner Carl F. Gutbier and Fanny Thilo. He studied chemistry at the Technical University of Dresden followed by studies at the Ludwig-Maximilians-Universität München, and at the University of Zurich. His influences included Otto Fischer, Fritz Foerster, Walther Hempel and Alfred Werner. He received a doctorate from University of Erlangen in 1899 and a habilitation in 1902. He became an associate professor in 1907 and a full professor from 1912 at the Technische Hochschule Stuttgart. After an interruption serving in the First World War he became professor at the University of Jena, serving until 1926.

Gutbier worked on analytical techniques for metals like tellurium, palladium, and selenium. He also worked on bismuth salts, selenium colloids and took an interest in the history of chemistry.
