= Valence bond theory =

One of two foundational theories of quantum chemistry

In chemistry, valence bond (VB) theory is one of the two basic theories, along with molecular orbital (MO) theory, that were developed to use the methods of quantum mechanics to describe chemical bonding. It focuses on how the atomic orbitals of the dissociated atoms combine to give individual chemical bonds when a molecule is formed. In contrast, molecular orbital theory has orbitals that cover the whole molecule.

== History ==
In 1916, G. N. Lewis proposed that a chemical bond forms by the interaction of two shared bonding electrons, with the representation of molecules as Lewis structures. In 1916, Walther Kossel put forth his theory of the ionic chemical bond (octet rule), also independently advanced in the same year by Gilbert N. Lewis. Kossel put forward a theory similar to that of Lewis theory, except that Kossel supposed complete transfers of electrons between atoms, a model of ionic bonding. Both Lewis and Kossel based their bonding models on Abegg's rule (1904) that the difference between the maximum positive and negative valences of an element is frequently eight.

In 1921 the chemist Charles Rugeley Bury suggested that eight and eighteen electrons in a shell form stable configurations. Bury proposed that the electron configurations in transitional elements depended upon the valence electrons in their outer shell.

Although there is no mathematical formula either in chemistry or quantum mechanics for the arrangement of electrons in the atom, the hydrogen atom can be described by the Schrödinger equation and the Matrix Mechanics equation both derived in 1925. However, for hydrogen alone, in 1927 the Heitler–London theory was formulated which for the first time enabled the calculation of bonding properties of the hydrogen molecule H_{2} based on quantum mechanical considerations. Specifically, Walter Heitler determined how to use Schrödinger's wave equation (1926) to show how two hydrogen atom wavefunctions join together, with plus, minus, and exchange terms, to form a covalent bond. He then called up his associate Fritz London and they worked out the details of the theory over the course of the night. Later, Linus Pauling used the pair bonding ideas of Lewis together with Heitler–London theory to develop two other key concepts in VB theory: resonance (1928) and orbital hybridization (1930). According to Charles Coulson, author of the noted 1952 book Valence, this period marks the start of "modern valence bond theory", as contrasted with older valence bond theories, which are essentially electronic theories of valence couched in pre-wave-mechanical terms.

Linus Pauling published in 1931 his landmark paper on valence bond theory: "On the Nature of the Chemical Bond". Building on this article, Pauling's 1939 textbook: On the Nature of the Chemical Bond would become what some have called the bible of modern chemistry. This book helped experimental chemists to understand the impact of quantum theory on chemistry. However, the later edition in 1959 failed to adequately address the problems that appeared to be better understood by molecular orbital theory. The impact of valence theory declined during the 1960s and 1970s as molecular orbital theory grew in usefulness as it was implemented in large digital computer programs. Since the 1980s, the more difficult problems, of implementing valence bond theory into computer programs, have been solved largely, and valence bond theory has seen a resurgence.

== Theory ==
According to this theory a covalent bond is formed between two atoms by the overlap of half filled valence atomic orbitals of each atom containing one unpaired electron. Valence Bond theory describes chemical bonding better than Lewis Theory, which states that atoms share or transfer electrons so that they achieve the octet rule. It does not take into account orbital interactions or bond angles, and treats all covalent bonds equally. A valence bond structure resembles a Lewis structure, but when a molecule cannot be fully represented by a single Lewis structure, multiple valence bond structures are used. Each of these VB structures represents a specific Lewis structure. This combination of valence bond structures is the main point of resonance theory. Valence bond theory considers that the overlapping atomic orbitals of the participating atoms form a chemical bond. Because of the overlapping, it is most probable that electrons should be in the bond region. Valence bond theory views bonds as weakly coupled orbitals (small overlap). Valence bond theory is typically easier to employ in ground state molecules. The core orbitals and electrons remain essentially unchanged during the formation of bonds.

σ bond between two atoms: localization of electron density

Two p-orbitals forming a π-bond.

The overlapping atomic orbitals can differ. The two types of overlapping orbitals are sigma and pi. Sigma bonds occur when the orbitals of two shared electrons overlap head-to-head, with the electron density most concentrated between nuclei. Pi bonds occur when two orbitals overlap when they are parallel. For example, a bond between two s-orbital electrons is a sigma bond, because two spheres are always coaxial. In terms of bond order, single bonds have one sigma bond, double bonds consist of one sigma bond and one pi bond, and triple bonds contain one sigma bond and two pi bonds. However, the atomic orbitals for bonding may be hybrids. Hybridization is a model that describes how atomic orbitals combine to form new orbitals that better match the geometry of molecules. Atomic orbitals that are similar in energy combine to make hybrid orbitals. For example, the carbon in methane (CH_{4}) undergoes sp^{3} hybridization to form four equivalent orbitals, resulting in a tetrahedral shape. Different types of hybridization, such as sp, sp^{2}, and sp^{3}, correspond to specific molecular geometries (linear, trigonal planar, and tetrahedral), influencing the bond angles observed in molecules. Hybrid orbitals provide additional directionality to sigma bonds, accurately explaining molecular geometries.

== Comparison with MO theory ==
Valence bond theory complements molecular orbital theory (MO), which does not adhere to the valence bond idea that electron pairs are localized between two specific atoms in a molecule, but that they are distributed in sets of molecular orbitals which can extend over the entire molecule. Although both theories describe chemical bonding, MO generally offer a clearer and more reliable framework for predicting magnetic and ionization properties (and therefore optical and IR spectra). In particular, molecular orbitals can effectively account for paramagnetism arising from unpaired electrons, whereas VBT struggles.

Simple VB theory includes only covalent structures (for neutral molecules), but can be refined by adding terms for ionic structures to the wave function. Similarly simple MO theory considers a single electron configuration, with no correlation between the movement of different electrons, but correlation can be included by adding other configurations.

If many terms are considered in the wave functions, the two theories approach mathematical equivalence, However MO is a more popular approach than VB due to its easier implementation in the early days of computational chemistry.

Valence bond theory views aromatic properties of molecules as due to spin coupling of the π orbitals. This is essentially still the old idea of resonance between Friedrich August Kekulé von Stradonitz and James Dewar structures. In contrast, molecular orbital theory views aromaticity as delocalization of the π-electrons. Valence bond treatments are restricted to relatively small molecules, largely due to the lack of orthogonality between valence bond orbitals and between valence bond structures. The molecular orbitals are always orthogonal.

Valence bond theory cannot explain electronic transitions and spectroscopic properties as effectively as MO theory. While VB employs hybridization to explain bonding, it can oversimplify complex bonding situations, limiting its applicability in more intricate molecular geometries such as transition metal compounds.

On the other hand, VB theory provides a much more intuitive picture of the reorganization of electronic charge that takes place when bonds are broken and formed during the course of a chemical reaction.

Valence bond theory also correctly predicts the dissociation of homonuclear diatomic molecules into separate atoms even in the simplest models, while similarly crude MO approaches predict dissociation into a mixture of atoms and ions. For example, the MO function for dihydrogen is an equal mixture of the covalent and ionic valence bond structures and so predicts incorrectly that the molecule would dissociate into an equal mixture of hydrogen atoms and hydrogen positive and negative ions.

== Computational approaches ==
Modern valence bond theory replaces the overlapping atomic orbitals by overlapping valence bond orbitals that are expanded over a large number of basis functions, either centered each on one atom to give a classical valence bond picture, or centered on all atoms in the molecule. The resulting energies are more competitive with energies from calculations where electron correlation is introduced based on a Hartree–Fock reference wavefunction. The most recent text is by Shaik and Hiberty.

== Applications ==
An important aspect of the valence bond theory is the condition of maximum overlap, which leads to the formation of the strongest possible bonds. This theory is used to explain the covalent bond formation in many molecules.

sp^{3} hybridization in methane forms four equivalent sigma bonds with tetrahedral geometry.

For example, in the case of the F_{2} molecule, the F−F bond is formed by the overlap of p_{z} orbitals of the two F atoms, each containing an unpaired electron. Since the nature of the overlapping orbitals are different in H_{2} and F_{2} molecules, the bond strength and bond lengths differ between H_{2} and F_{2} molecules.

In methane (CH_{4}), the carbon atom undergoes sp^{3} hybridization, allowing it to form four equivalent sigma bonds with hydrogen atoms, resulting in a tetrahedral geometry. Hybridization also explains the equal C-H bond strengths.

In an HF molecule the covalent bond is formed by the overlap of the 1s orbital of H and the 2p_{z} orbital of F, each containing an unpaired electron. Mutual sharing of electrons between H and F results in a covalent bond in HF.

== See also ==
- Valence bond programs
