= Octet rule =

Chemical rule of thumb

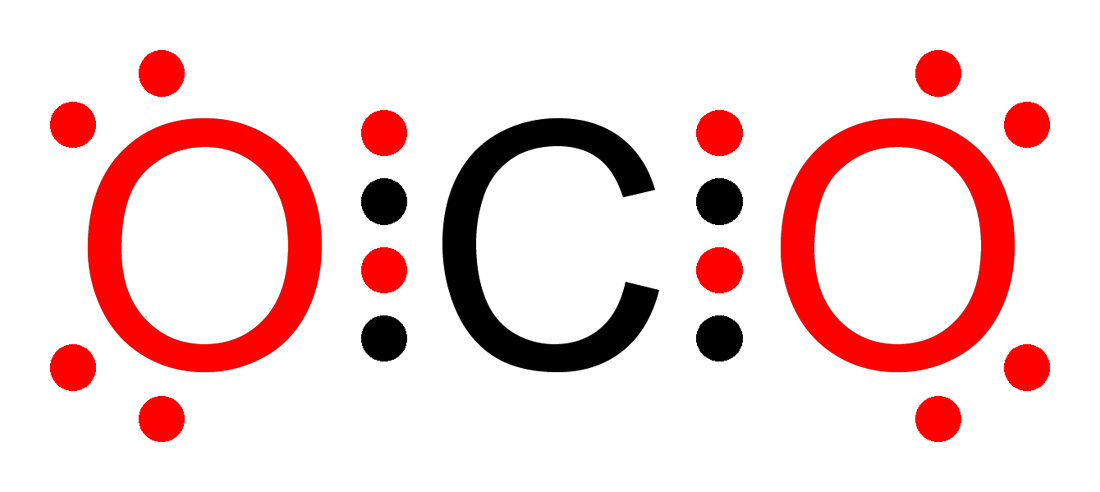
The bonding in carbon dioxide (CO_{2}): all atoms are surrounded by 8 electrons, fulfilling the octet rule.

The octet rule is a rule of thumb in chemistry that describes the strong tendency for main-group elements to bond in such a way that each atom has eight electrons (an "octet") in its valence shell, giving it the same electronic configuration as a noble gas atom. Electrons shared between two atoms in a covalent bond, are counted toward the octet of each atom. The rule is especially applicable to carbon, nitrogen, oxygen, and the halogens, although more generally the rule is applicable for the s-block and p-block of the periodic table. Other rules exist for other elements, such as the duplet rule for hydrogen and helium, and the 18-electron rule for transition metals.

For example, the valence electrons in a molecule of carbon dioxide (CO_{2}) can be visualized using a Lewis electron dot diagram. In carbon dioxide each oxygen shares four electrons with the central carbon, two (shown in red) from the oxygen itself and two (shown in black) from the carbon. All four of these electrons are counted in both the carbon octet and the oxygen octet, so that both atoms are considered to obey the octet rule.

== Example: sodium chloride (NaCl) ==

The octet rule is simplest in the case of ionic bonding between two atoms, one a metal of low electronegativity and the other a nonmetal of high electronegativity. For example, sodium metal and chlorine gas combine to form sodium chloride, a crystal lattice composed of alternating sodium and chloride ions.

An isolated chlorine atom (Cl) has seven valence electrons. The outer most shell in chlorine is only missing a single electron. One additional electron completely fills the outer electron shell with eight electrons, completing its octet. Adding an electron to chlorine produces the chloride ion (Cl^{−}) and releases 3.62 eV of energy.

A sodium atom (Na) has a single valence electron in its outermost electron shell. The octet rule favors removal of this outermost electron to form the Na^{+} ion, which happens to have the same electron configuration as Cl^{−}. Sodium is observed to transfer one electron to chlorine during the formation of sodium chloride, such that the resulting lattice is best considered as a periodic array of Na^{+} and Cl^{−} ions.

To remove the outermost Na electron and return to an "octet-approved" state requires a small amount of energy: 5.14 eV. This energy is provided from the 3.62 eV released during chloride formation, and the electrostatic attraction between positively-charged Na^{+} and negatively-charged Cl^{−} ions, which releases a 8.12 eV lattice energy.

== History ==
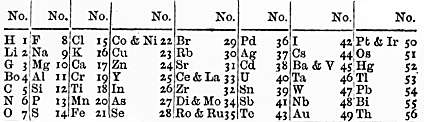
Newlands' law of octaves

In 1864, the English chemist John Newlands classified the sixty-two known elements into eight groups, based on their physical properties.

In the late 19th century, it was known that coordination compounds (formerly called "molecular compounds") were formed by the combination of atoms or molecules in such a manner that the valencies of the atoms involved apparently became satisfied. In 1893, Alfred Werner showed that the number of atoms or groups associated with a central atom (the "coordination number") is often 4 or 6; other coordination numbers up to a maximum of 8 were known, but less frequent. In 1904, Richard Abegg was one of the first to extend the concept of coordination number to a concept of valence in which he distinguished atoms as electron donors or acceptors, leading to positive and negative valence states that greatly resemble the modern concept of oxidation states. Abegg noted that the difference between the maximum positive and negative valences of an element under his model is frequently eight. In 1916, Gilbert N. Lewis referred to this insight as Abegg's rule and used it to help formulate his cubical atom model and the "rule of eight", which began to distinguish between valence and valence electrons. In 1919, Irving Langmuir refined these concepts further and renamed them the "cubical octet atom" and "octet theory". The "octet theory" evolved into what is now known as the "octet rule".

Walther Kossel and Gilbert N. Lewis saw that noble gases did not have the tendency of taking part in chemical reactions under ordinary conditions. On the basis of this observation, they concluded that atoms of noble gases are stable and on the basis of this conclusion they proposed a theory of valency known as "electronic theory of valency" in 1916:

During the formation of a chemical bond, atoms combine together by gaining, losing or sharing electrons in such a way that they acquire nearest noble gas configuration.

== Explanation in quantum theory ==
The quantum theory of the atom explains the eight electrons as a closed shell with an s^{2}p^{6} electron configuration. A closed-shell configuration is one in which low-lying energy levels are full and higher energy levels are empty. For example, the neon atom ground state has a full n = 2 shell (2s^{2}2p^{6}) and an empty n = 3 shell. According to the octet rule, the atoms immediately before and after neon in the periodic table (i.e. C, N, O, F, Na, Mg and Al), tend to attain a similar configuration by gaining, losing, or sharing electrons.

The argon atom has an analogous 3s^{2}3p^{6} configuration. There is also an empty 3d level, but it is at considerably higher energy than 3s and 3p (unlike in the hydrogen atom), so that 3s^{2}3p^{6} is still considered a closed shell for chemical purposes. The atoms immediately before and after argon tend to attain this configuration in compounds. There are, however, some hypervalent molecules in which the 3d level may play a part in the bonding, although this is controversial (see below).

For helium there is no 1p level according to the quantum theory, so that 1s^{2} is a closed shell with no p electrons. The atoms before and after helium (H and Li) follow a duet rule and tend to have the same 1s^{2} configuration as helium.

== Exceptions ==
Many reactive intermediates do not obey the octet rule. Most are unstable, although some can be isolated.

Typically, octet rule violations occur in either low-dimensional coordination geometries or in radical species. Although it is commonly taught that hypervalent molecules violate the octet rule, ab initio calculations show that almost all known examples obey the octet rule. The molecules form many fractional bonds through resonance (see § Hypervalent molecules below), but each resonance structure does obey the octet rule.

=== Low-dimensional geometries ===
In the trigonal planar coordination geometry, one p orbital points out of the bonding plane, and can only overlap with nearby atomic orbitals in a π bond. If that p orbital would be empty in an isolated atom, it may be filled through an intramolecular dative bond, as with aminoboranes. However, in some cases (e.g. boron trichloride and various boranes, triphenylmethanium), no nearby filled orbital can profitably overlap with the empty p orbital. In such cases, the orbital remains empty, and the compound obeys a "sextet rule". Likewise, linear compounds, such as dimethylzinc, have two p orbitals perpendicular to the bonding axis, and may obey a "quartet rule". In either case, the empty unshielded orbitals tend to attract adducts.

=== Radicals ===
Radicals satisfy the octet rule in one spin orientation, with four spin-up electrons in the valence shell, and almost satisfy it in the opposite spin orientation. Thus, for example, the methyl radical (CH_{3}), which has an unpaired electron in a non-bonding orbital on the carbon atom and no electron of opposite spin in the same orbital. Another example is the radical chlorine monoxide (ClO^{•}) which is involved in ozone depletion.

Stable radicals tend to adopt states in which the unpaired electron can delocalize through resonance. In such cases, the octet rule can be restored through the formalism of a 1- or 3-electron bond.

Species such as carbenes can be interpreted two different ways, depending on their spin state. Triplet carbenes are best thought of as two radicals localized on the same atom, and obey the octet rule in those radicals' shared spin-up orientation. Singlet carbenes tend to adopt a planar configuration, and are best thought of as obeying the planar sextet rule.

== Hypervalent molecules ==
Main-group elements in the third and later rows of the periodic table can form hypercoordinate or hypervalent molecules in which the central main-group atom is bonded to more than four other atoms, such as phosphorus pentafluoride, PF_{5}, and sulfur hexafluoride, SF_{6}. For example, in PF_{5}, if it is supposed that there are five true covalent bonds in which five distinct electron pairs are shared, then the phosphorus would be surrounded by 10 valence electrons in violation of the octet rule. In the early days of quantum mechanics, Pauling proposed that third-row atoms can form five bonds by using one s, three p and one d orbitals, or six bonds by using one s, three p and two d orbitals. To form five bonds, the one s, three p and one d orbitals combine to form five sp^{3}d hybrid orbitals which each share an electron pair with a halogen atom, for a total of 10 shared electrons, two more than the octet rule predicts. Similarly to form six bonds, the six sp^{3}d^{2} hybrid orbitals form six bonds with 12 shared electrons. In this model the availability of empty d orbitals is used to explain the fact that third-row atoms such as phosphorus and sulfur can form more than four covalent bonds, whereas second-row atoms such as nitrogen and oxygen are strictly limited by the octet rule.

5 resonance structures of phosphorus pentafluoride

However other models describe the bonding using only s and p orbitals in agreement with the octet rule. A valence bond description of PF_{5} uses resonance between different PF_{4}^{+} F^{−} structures, so that each F is bonded by a covalent bond in four structures and an ionic bond in one structure. Each resonance structure has eight valence electrons on P. A molecular orbital theory description considers the highest occupied molecular orbital to be a non-bonding orbital localized on the five fluorine atoms, in addition to four occupied bonding orbitals, so again there are only eight valence electrons on the phosphorus. The validity of the octet rule for hypervalent molecules is further supported by ab initio molecular orbital calculations, which show that the contribution of d functions to the bonding orbitals is small.

Nevertheless, for historical reasons, structures implying more than eight electrons around elements like P, S, Se, or I are still common in textbooks and research articles. In spite of the unimportance of d shell expansion in chemical bonding, this practice allows structures to be shown without using a large number of formal charges or using partial bonds and is recommended by the IUPAC as a convenient formalism in preference to depictions that better reflect the bonding. On the other hand, showing more than eight electrons around Be, B, C, N, O, or F (or more than two around H, He, or Li) is considered an error by most authorities. In particular, instead of pentavalent N, tetravalent N^{+} is written (e. g. not H−O−N(=O)=O but H−O−N^{+}(=O)−O^{−}).

== Other rules ==
The octet rule is only applicable to main-group elements. Other elements follow other electron counting rules as their valence electron configurations are different from main-group elements. These other rules are shown below:

Element type	First shell	p-block (Main group)	d-block (Transition metal)
Electron counting rules	Duet/Duplet rule	Octet rule	18-electron rule
Full valence configuration	s^{2}	s^{2}p^{6}	d^{10}s^{2}p^{6}

- The duet rule or duplet rule of the first shell applies to H, He and Li—the noble gas helium has two electrons in its outer shell, which is very stable. (Since there is no 1p subshell, 1s is followed immediately by 2s, and thus shell 1 can only have at most 2 valence electrons). Hydrogen only needs one additional electron to attain this stable configuration, while lithium needs to lose one.
- For transition metals, molecules tend to obey the 18-electron rule which corresponds to the utilization of valence d, s and p orbitals to form bonding and non-bonding orbitals. However, unlike the octet rule for main-group elements, transition metals do not strictly obey the 18-electron rule and the valence electron count can vary between 12 and 18.

== See also ==
- Lewis structure
- Electron counting
