= Cubical atom =

Early atomic model

The cubical atom was an early atomic model in which electrons were positioned at the eight corners of a cube in a non-polar atom or molecule. This theory was developed in 1902 by Gilbert N. Lewis and published in 1916 in the article "The Atom and the Molecule" and used to account for the phenomenon of valency. Lewis' theory was based on Abegg's rule. It was further developed in 1919 by Irving Langmuir as the cubical octet atom. The figure below shows structural representations for elements of the second row of the periodic table.

Although the cubical model of the atom was soon abandoned in favor of the quantum mechanical model based on the Schrödinger equation, and is therefore now principally of historical interest, it represented an important step towards the understanding of the chemical bond. The 1916 article by Lewis also introduced the concept of the electron pair in the covalent bond, the octet rule, and the now-called Lewis structure.

== Bonding in the cubical atom model ==
Single covalent bonds are formed when two atoms share an edge, as in structure C below. This results in the sharing of two electrons. Ionic bonds are formed by the transfer of an electron from one cube to another without sharing an edge (structure A). An intermediate state where only one corner is shared (structure B) was also postulated by Lewis.

Double bonds are formed by sharing a face between two cubic atoms. This results in sharing four electrons:

Triple bonds could not be accounted for by the cubical atom model, because there is no way of having two cubes share three parallel edges. Lewis suggested that the electron pairs in atomic bonds have a special attraction, which result in a tetrahedral structure, as in the figure below (the new location of the electrons is represented by the dotted circles in the middle of the thick edges). This allows the formation of a single bond by sharing a corner, a double bond by sharing an edge, and a triple bond by sharing a face. It also accounts for the free rotation around single bonds and for the tetrahedral geometry of methane.

== See also ==
- History of molecular theory
