= Main-group element =

Chemical elements in groups 1, 2, 13–18

The periodic table of the chemical elements. The columns represent the groups. Groups 1, 2 and 13 to 18 constitute the main group. Sometimes groups 3 and 12, as well as the lanthanides and actinides (the two rows at the bottom), are also included in the main group.

In chemistry and atomic physics, the main group is the group of elements (sometimes called the representative elements) whose lightest members are represented by helium, lithium, beryllium, boron, carbon, nitrogen, oxygen, and fluorine as arranged in the periodic table of the elements. The main group includes the elements (except hydrogen, which is sometimes excluded) in groups 1 and 2 (s-block), and groups 13 to 18 (p-block). The s-block elements are primarily characterised by one main oxidation state, and the p-block elements, when they have multiple oxidation states, often have common oxidation states separated by two units. Advances in this area are often described in the journal Main Group Chemistry.

Main-group elements (with some of the lighter transition metals) are the most abundant elements on Earth, in the Solar System, and in the universe. Group 12 elements are often considered to be transition metals; however, zinc (Zn), cadmium (Cd), and mercury (Hg) share some properties of both groups, and some scientists believe they should be included in the main group.

Occasionally, even the group 3 elements as well as the lanthanides and actinides have been included, because especially the group 3 elements and many lanthanides are electropositive elements with only one main oxidation state like the group 1 and 2 elements. The position of the actinides is more questionable, but the most common and stable of them, thorium (Th) and uranium (U), are similar to main-group elements as thorium is an electropositive element with only one main oxidation state (+4), and uranium has two main ones separated by two oxidation units (+4 and +6).

In older nomenclature, the main-group elements are groups IA and IIA, and groups IIIB to 0 (CAS groups IIIA to VIIIA). Group 12 is labelled as group IIB in both systems. Group 3 is labelled as group IIIA in the older nomenclature (CAS group IIIB).

== See also ==
- Abundance of elements in Earth's crust
- Main group organometallic chemistry
