= Richard Abegg =

German chemist (1869–1910)

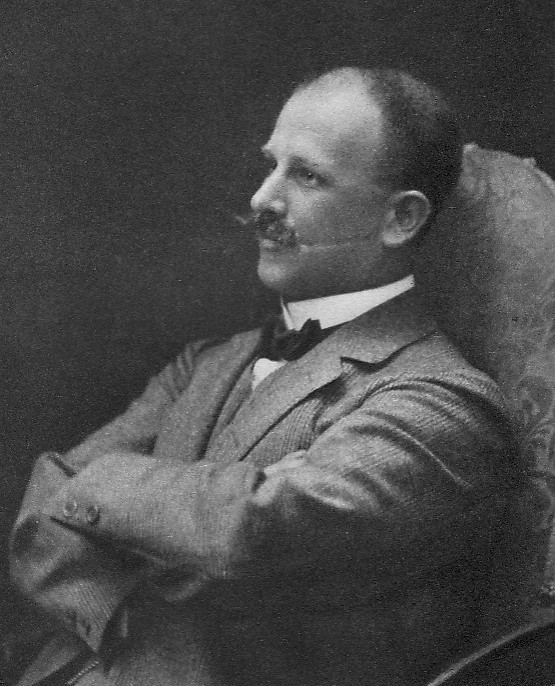
- Born: 9 January 1869; Danzig, Prussia, North German Confederation (now Gdańsk, Pomeranian Voivodeship, Poland)
- Died: 4 April 1910 (aged 41); Köslin, German Empire (now Koszalin, West Pomeranian Voivodeship, Poland)
- Education: University of Kiel; University of Tübingen; University of Berlin
- Known for: Abegg's rule
- Scientific career
- Fields: Chemist
- Workplaces: University of Göttingen; Stockholm University; University of Breslau
- Doctoral advisor: August Wilhelm von Hofmann
- Doctoral students: Clara Immerwahr

Richard Wilhelm Heinrich Abegg (9 January 1869 – 3 April 1910) was a German chemist and pioneer of valence theory. He proposed that the difference of the maximum positive and negative valence of an element tends to be eight. This has come to be known as Abegg's rule. He was a gas balloon enthusiast, which caused his death at the age of 41 when he crashed in his balloon in Silesia.

Abegg received his PhD on 19 July 1891 as the student of August Wilhelm von Hofmann at the University of Berlin. Abegg learned organic chemistry from Hofmann, but one year after finishing his PhD degree he began researching physical chemistry while studying with Friedrich Wilhelm Ostwald in Leipzig, Germany. Abegg later served as private assistant to Walther Nernst at the University of Göttingen and to Svante Arrhenius at the Stockholm University.

Abegg discovered the theory of freezing-point depression and anticipated Gilbert Newton Lewis's octet rule by revealing that the lowest and highest oxidation states of elements often differ by eight. He researched many topics in physical chemistry, including freezing points, the dielectric constant of ice, osmotic pressures, oxidation potentials, and complex ions.

== Personal life and education ==
Richard Abegg was the son of Wilhelm Abegg and Margarete Friedenthal. He had a brother, Wilhelm Abegg, who became the Prussian Secretary of State. After attending Wilhelm High School in Berlin, Abegg studied organic chemistry at the University of Kiel and the University of Tübingen. He then attended the University of Berlin, from which he received his doctorate as the student of August Wilhelm von Hofmann. In 1895, he married Line Simon, who was also a ballooning enthusiast.

Abegg occupied himself with photography and balloon excursions. He was the initiator and chairman of the Silesian Club for Aeronautics in Breslau. Furthermore, he had an assessor's function with the presidency of the German Air Sailors' Association. On 3 April 1910, Abegg flew from Breslau to Köslin in a balloon; at the end of the flight, the balloon's basket caught in some bushes during the landing, resulting in Abegg being thrown out and striking his head. He died from a fractured skull in the early morning of 4 April.

== Work ==
During school, Abegg fulfilled his duties in the military. In 1891, he became an officer of the German Reserves. In 1900, he became an Oberleutnant in the Reserves in the 9th Regiment of Hussars. During this year, he made his first flight in a balloon, for military purposes. Balloon flights became a frequent pastime of both Abegg and his wife. He made many scientific observations during his subsequent flights, which were never published.

In 1894, Abegg worked as an assistant to Walther Nernst, one of the founders of physical chemistry and, at the time, Professor of Physical Chemistry. In 1897, he took a position as a professor of chemistry at the University of Breslau. Two years later, Abegg was promoted to a Privatdozent (chemistry chair). A year later he became a professor. Clara Immerwahr, the first wife of Fritz Haber, studied and graduated as his student. In 1909 he became a full professor. Together with his colleague Guido Bodländer, he published on electro-affinity, then a new principle of inorganic chemistry.

Abegg is known best for his research recognizing the role that valence had with respect to chemical interactions. He found that some elements were less likely to combine into molecules, and from this concluded that the more stable elements had what are now called full electron shells. He was able to explain the attraction of atoms through opposite electrical charges. He also made the distinction between normal valence and contravalence. He found that the sum of these two valences always comes to eight, a rule that is now known as Abegg's rule.

Abegg was the editor of Zeitschrift für Elektrochemie from 1901 until his death.

== Books by Abegg ==
- Über das Chrysen und seine Derivate. Schade, Berlin 1891
- Anleitung zur Berechnung volumetrischer Analysen. Grass, Barth & Co, Breslau 1900
- Die Theorie der elektrolytischen Dissociation. Enke, Stuttgart 1903

== See also ==
- Abegg's rule
- Valence (chemistry)
