= Abegg's rule =

In chemistry, Abegg's rule states that the difference between the maximum positive and negative valence of an element is frequently eight. The rule used a historic meaning of valence which resembles the modern concept of oxidation state in which an atom is an electron donor or receiver. Abegg's rule is sometimes referred to as "Abegg’s law of valence and countervalence".

In general, for a given chemical element (as sulfur) Abegg's rule states that the sum of the absolute value of its negative valence (such as −2 for sulfur in H_{2}S) and its positive valence of maximum value (as +6 for sulfur in H_{2}SO_{4}) is often equal to 8.

== History ==
The concept was formulated in 1904 by German chemist Richard Abegg. Gilbert N. Lewis was one of the first to refer to the concept as "Abegg's rule" when he used it as a basis of argument in a 1916 article to develop his cubical atom theory, which developed into the octet rule. That article helped inspire Linus Pauling to write his 1938 textbook The Nature of the Chemical Bond.

== See also ==
- History of molecular theory
- Irving Langmuir
