= Sextuple bond =

Covalent bond involving 12 bonding electrons

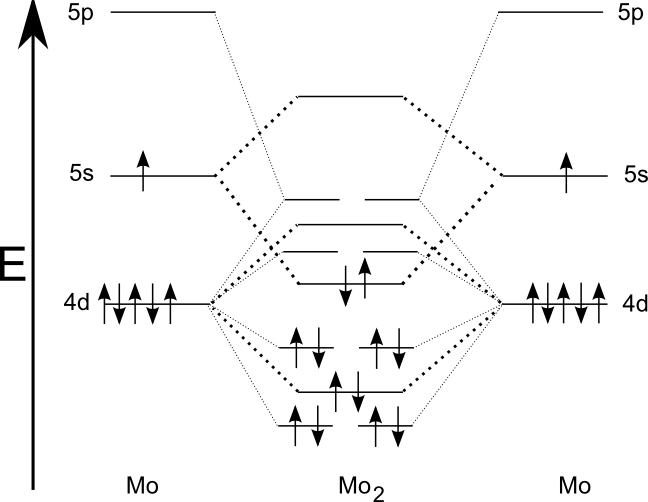
MO diagram of dimolybdenum

A sextuple bond is a type of covalent bond involving 12 bonding electrons and in which the bond order is 6. The only known molecules with true sextuple bonds are the diatomic dimolybdenum (Mo_{2}) and ditungsten (W_{2}), which exist in the gaseous phase.

== Theoretical analysis ==
Roos et al argue that no stable element can form bonds of higher order than a sextuple bond, because the latter corresponds to a hybrid of the s orbital and all five d orbitals, and f orbitals contract too close to the nucleus to bond in the lanthanides. Indeed, quantum mechanical calculations have revealed that the dimolybdenum bond is formed by a combination of two σ bonds, two π bonds and two δ bonds. (Also, the σ and π bonds contribute much more significantly to the sextuple bond than the δ bonds.)

Although no φ bonding has been reported for transition metal dimers, it is predicted that if any sextuply-bonded actinides were to exist, at least one of the bonds would likely be a φ bond as in quintuply-bonded diuranium and dineptunium. No sextuple bond has been observed in lanthanides or actinides.

For the majority of elements, even the possibility of a sextuple bond is foreclosed, because the d electrons ferromagnetically couple, instead of bonding. The only known exceptions are dimolybdenum and ditungsten.

=== Quantum-mechanical treatment ===
The formal bond order (FBO) of a molecule is half the number of bonding electrons surplus to antibonding electrons; for a typical molecule, it attains exclusively integer values. A full quantum treatment requires a more nuanced picture, in which electrons may exist in a superposition, contributing fractionally to both bonding and antibonding orbitals. In a formal sextuple bond, there would be P = 6 different electron pairs; an effective sextuple bond would then have all six contributing almost entirely to bonding orbitals.

Molecule	FBO	EBO
Cr_{2}	6	3.5
[PhCrCrPh]	5	3.5
Cr_{2}(O_{2}CCH_{3})_{4}	4	2.0
Mo_{2}	6	5.2
W_{2}	6	5.2
Ac_{2}	3	1.7
Th_{2}	4	3.7
Pa_{2}	5	4.5
U_{2}	6	3.8
[PhUUPh]	5	3.7
[Re_{2}Cl_{8}]^{2−}	4	3.2

In Roos et al's calculations, the effective bond order (EBO) could be determined by the formula

$$EBO = \left ( \frac{1}{2} \right )\sum_{p=1}^P(\eta_{b,p}-\eta_{ab,p})-c$$

where η_{b} is the proportion of formal bonding orbital occupation for an electron pair p, η_{ab} is the proportion of the formal antibonding orbital occupation, and c is a correction factor accounting for deviations from equilibrium geometry. Several metal-metal bonds' EBOs are given in the table at right, compared to their formal bond orders.

Dimolybdenum and ditungsten are the only molecules with effective bond orders above 5, with a quintuple bond and a partially formed sixth covalent bond. Dichromium, while formally described as having a sextuple bond, is best described as a pair of chromium atoms with all electron spins exchange-coupled to each other.

While diuranium is also formally described as having a sextuple bond, relativistic quantum mechanical calculations have determined it to be a quadruple bond with four electrons ferromagnetically coupled to each other rather than in two formal bonds. Previous calculations on diuranium did not treat the electronic molecular Hamiltonian relativistically and produced higher bond orders of 4.2 with two ferromagnetically coupled electrons.

== Known instances: dimolybdenum and ditungsten ==
Laser evaporation of a molybdenum sheet at low temperatures (7 K) produces gaseous dimolybdenum (Mo_{2}). The resulting molecules can then be imaged with, for instance, near-infrared spectroscopy or UV spectroscopy.

Both ditungsten and dimolybdenum have very short bond lengths compared to neighboring metal dimers. For example, sextuply-bonded dimolybdenum has an equilibrium bond length of 1.93 Å. This equilibrium internuclear distance is significantly lower than in the dimer of any neighboring 4d transition metal, and suggestive of higher bond orders. However, the bond dissociation energies of ditungsten and dimolybdenum are rather low, because the short internuclear distance introduces geometric strain.

Dimer	Force constant (Å)	EBO
Cu_{2}	1.13	1.00
Ag_{2}	1.18	1.00
Au_{2}	2.12	1.00
Zn_{2}	0.01	0.01
Cd_{2}	0.02	0.02
Hg_{2}	0.02	0.02
Mn_{2}	0.09	0.07
Mo_{2}	6.33	5.38

One empirical technique to determine bond order is spectroscopic examination of bond force constants. Linus Pauling investigated the relationships between bonding atoms and developed a formula that predicts that bond order is roughly proportional to the force constant; that is,

$$k_e=n\cdot k_e^{(1)}$$

where n is the bond order, k_{e} is the force constant of the interatomic interaction and k_{e}^{(1)} is the force constant of a single bond between the atoms.

The table at right shows some select force constants for metal-metal dimers compared to their EBOs; consistent with a sextuple bond, molybdenum's summed force constant is substantially more than quintuple the single-bond force constant.

Like dichromium, dimolybdenum and ditungsten are expected to exhibit a ^{1}Σ_{g}^{+} singlet ground state. However, in tungsten, this ground state arises from a hybrid of either two ^{5}D_{0} ground states or two ^{7}S_{3} excited states. Only the latter corresponds to the formation of a stable, sextuply-bonded ditungsten dimer.

== Ligand effects ==
Although sextuple bonding in homodimers is rare, it remains a possibility in larger molecules.

=== Aromatics ===
Theoretical computations suggest that bent dimetallocenes have a higher bond order than their linear counterparts. For this reason, the Schaefer lab has investigated dimetallocenes for natural sextuple bonds. However, such compounds tend to exhibit Jahn–Teller distortion, rather than a true sextuple bond.

For example, dirhenocene is bent. Calculating its frontier molecular orbitals suggests the existence of relatively stable singlet and triplet states, with a sextuple bond in the singlet state. But that state is the excited one; the triplet ground state should exhibit a formal quintuple bond. Similarly, for the dibenzene complexes Cr_{2}(C_{6}H_{6})_{2}, Mo_{2}(C_{6}H_{6})_{2}, and W_{2}(C_{6}H_{6})_{2}, molecular bonding orbitals for the triplet states with symmetries D_{6h} and D_{6d} indicate the possibility of an intermetallic sextuple bond. Quantum chemistry calculations reveal, however, that the corresponding D_{2h} singlet geometry is stabler than the D_{6h} triplet state by 3–39 kcal/mol, depending on the central metal.

=== Oxo ligands ===
Both quantum mechanical calculations and photoelectron spectroscopy of the tungsten oxide clusters W_{2}O_{n} (n = 1–6) indicate that increased oxidation state reduces the bond order in ditungsten. At first, the weak δ bonds break to yield a quadruply-bonded W_{2}O; further oxidation generates the ditungsten complex W_{2}O_{6} with two bridging oxo ligands and no direct W–W bonds.
