= Non-bonding orbital =

Molecular orbital

A non-bonding orbital, also known as non-bonding molecular orbital (NBMO), is a molecular orbital whose occupation by electrons neither increases nor decreases the bond order between the involved atoms. Non-bonding orbitals are often designated by the letter n in molecular orbital diagrams and electron transition notations. Non-bonding orbitals are the equivalent in molecular orbital theory of the lone pairs in Lewis structures. The energy level of a non-bonding orbital is typically in between the lower energy of a valence shell bonding orbital and the higher energy of a corresponding antibonding orbital. As such, a non-bonding orbital with electrons would commonly be a HOMO (highest occupied molecular orbital).

According to molecular orbital theory, molecular orbitals are often modeled by the linear combination of atomic orbitals. In a simple diatomic molecule such as hydrogen fluoride (chemical formula: $\ce{HF}$), one atom may have many more electrons than the other. A sigma bonding orbital is created between the atomic orbitals with like symmetry. Some orbitals (e.g. p_{x} and p_{y} orbitals from the fluorine in $\ce{HF}$) may not have any other orbitals to combine with and become non-bonding molecular orbitals. In the $\ce{HF}$ example, the p_{x} and p_{y} orbitals remain p_{x} and p_{y} orbitals in shape but when viewed as molecular orbitals are thought of as non-bonding. The energy of the orbital does not depend on the length of any bond within the molecule. Its occupation neither increases nor decreases the stability of the molecule, relative to the atoms, since its energy is the same in the molecule as in one of the atoms. For example, there are two rigorously non-bonding orbitals that are occupied in the ground state of the hydrogen fluoride diatomic molecule; these molecular orbitals are localized on the fluorine atom and are composed of p-type atomic orbitals whose orientation is perpendicular to the internuclear axis. They are therefore unable to overlap and interact with the s-type valence orbital on the hydrogen atom.

Although non-bonding orbitals are often similar to the atomic orbitals of their constituent atom, they do not need to be similar. An example of a non-similar one is the non-bonding orbital of the allyl anion, whose electron density is concentrated on the first and third carbon atoms.

In fully delocalized canonical molecular orbital theory, it is often the case that none of the molecular orbitals of a molecule are strictly non-bonding in nature. However, in the context of localized molecular orbitals, the concept of a filled, non-bonding orbital tends to correspond to electrons described in Lewis structure terms as "lone pairs."

There are several symbols used to represent unoccupied non-bonding orbitals. Occasionally, n* is used, in analogy to σ* and π*, but this usage is rare. Often, the atomic orbital symbol is used, most often p for p orbital; others have used the letter a for a generic atomic orbital. (By Bent's rule, unoccupied orbitals for a main-group element are almost always of p character, since s character is stabilizing and will be used for bonding orbitals. As an exception, the LUMO of phenyl cation is an sp^{x} (x ≈ 2) atomic orbital, due to the geometric constraint of the benzene ring.) Finally, Woodward and Hoffmann used the letter ω for non-bonding orbitals (occupied or unoccupied) in their monograph Conservation of Orbital Symmetry.

== Electron transitions ==
Electrons in molecular non-bonding orbitals can undergo electron transitions such as n→σ* or n→π* transitions. For example, n→π* transitions can be seen in ultraviolet-visible spectroscopy of compounds with carbonyl groups, although absorbance is fairly weak.

== See also ==
- Molecular orbital theory
- Bonding orbital
- Antibonding orbital
- LCAO
