= Non-bonding electron =

A non-bonding electron is an electron not involved in chemical bonding. This can refer to:

- Lone pair, with the electron localized on one atom.
- Non-bonding orbital, with the electron delocalized throughout the molecule.
