= Bonding electron =

A bonding electron is an electron involved in chemical bonding. This can refer to:

- Chemical bond, a lasting attraction between atoms, ions or molecules
- Covalent bond or molecular bond, a sharing of electron pairs between atoms
- Bonding molecular orbital, an attraction between the atomic orbitals of atoms in a molecule
