= Phi bond =

Type of chemical bond

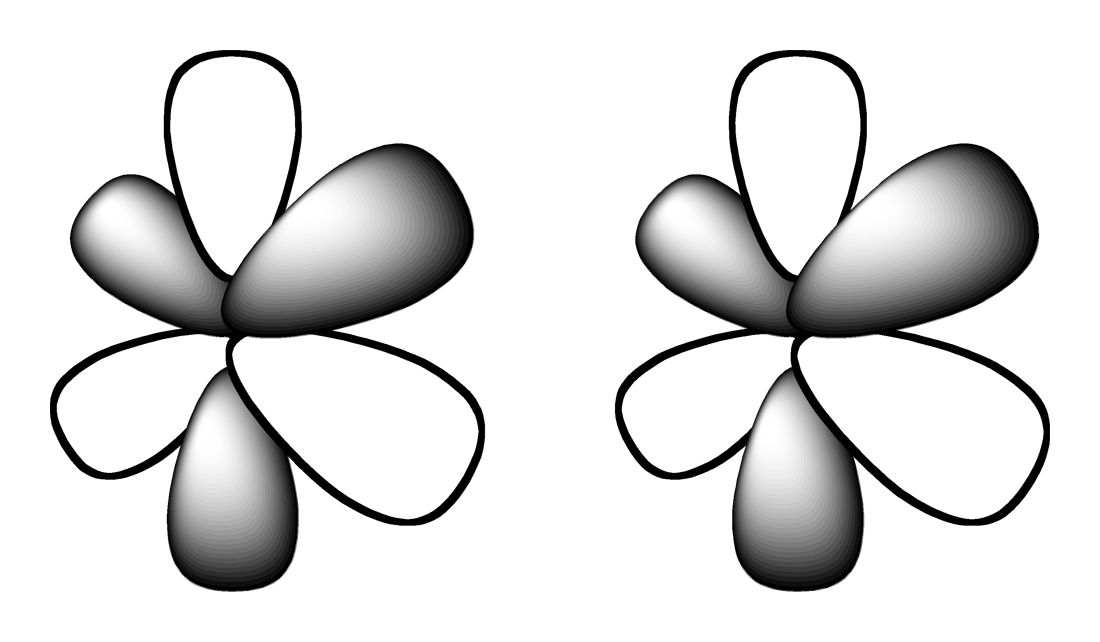
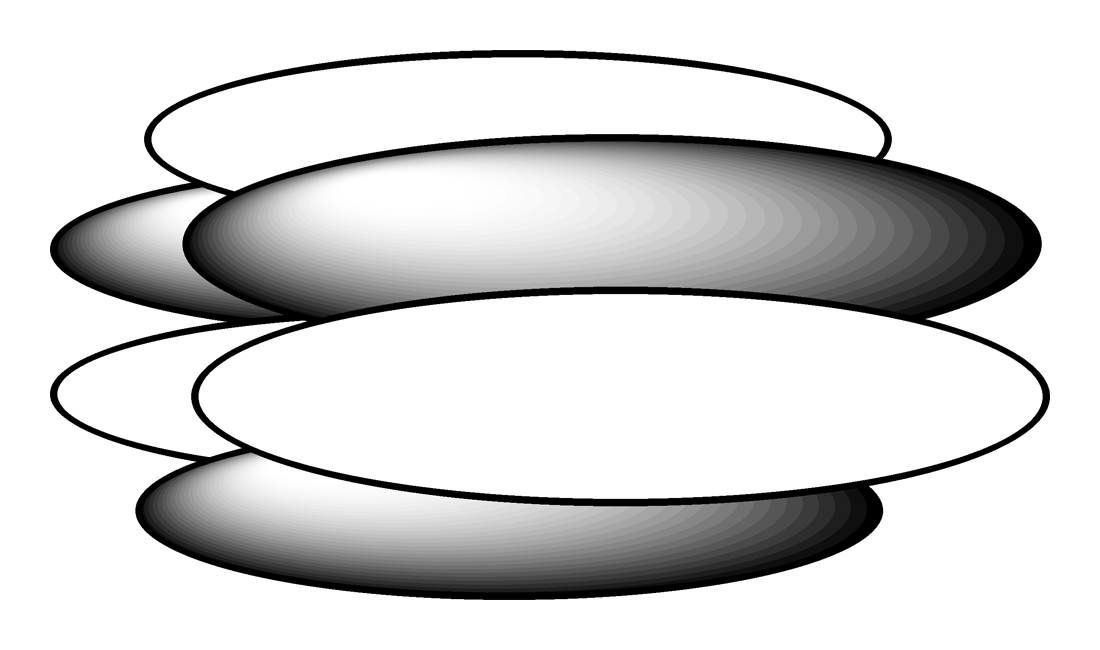
Suitably-aligned f atomic orbitals can overlap to form a φ molecular orbital (a φ bond)

In chemistry, phi bonds (φ bonds) are usually covalent chemical bonds, where six lobes of one involved atomic orbital overlap six lobes of the other involved atomic orbital. This overlap leads to the formation of a bonding molecular orbital with three nodal planes which contain the internuclear axis and go through both atoms.

The Greek letter φ in their name refers to f orbitals, since the orbital symmetry of the φ bond is the same as that of the usual (6-lobed) type of f orbital when seen down the bond axis.

There was one possible candidate reported in 2005 of a molecule with phi bonding: a U−U bond in the molecule diuranium (U_{2}). However, later studies that accounted for spin–orbit interactions found that the bonding was only of fourth order. Experimental evidence for phi bonding between a thorium atom and cyclooctatetraene in thorocene has been supported by computational analysis, though this mixed-orbital bond has strong ionic character and is not a traditional phi bond.

== See also ==
- Sigma bond
- Pi bond
- Delta bond
