= Energy level =

Different states of quantum systems

Energy levels for an electron in an atom: ground state and excited states. After absorbing energy, an electron may "jump" from the ground state to a higher energy excited state.

A quantum mechanical system or particle that is bound—that is, confined spatially—can only take on certain discrete values of energy, called energy levels. This contrasts with classical particles, which can have any amount of energy. The term is commonly used for the energy levels of the electrons in atoms, ions, or molecules, which are bound by the electric field of the nucleus, but can also refer to energy levels of nuclei or vibrational or rotational energy levels in molecules. The energy spectrum of a system with such discrete energy levels is said to be quantized.

In chemistry and atomic physics, an electron shell, or principal energy level, may be thought of as the orbit of one or more electrons around an atom's nucleus. The closest shell to the nucleus is called the "1 shell" (also called "K shell"), followed by the "2 shell" (or "L shell"), then the "3 shell" (or "M shell"), and so on further and further from the nucleus. The shells correspond with the principal quantum numbers (n= 1, 2, 3, 4, …) or are labeled alphabetically with letters used in the X-ray notation (K, L, M, N, …).

Each shell can contain only a fixed number of electrons: The first shell can hold up to two electrons, the second shell can hold up to eight (2 + 6) electrons, the third shell can hold up to 18 (2 + 6 + 10) and so on. The general formula is that the nth shell can in principle hold up to 2n^{2} electrons. Since electrons are electrically attracted to the nucleus, an atom's electrons will generally occupy outer shells only if the more inner shells have already been completely filled by other electrons which vaguely assumes that all electron shells have to be complete over time. However, this is not a strict requirement: atoms may have two or even three incomplete outer shells. (See Madelung rule for more details.) For an explanation of why electrons exist in these shells see electron configuration.

If the potential energy is set to zero at infinite distance from the atomic nucleus or molecule, the usual convention, then bound electron states have negative potential energy.

If an atom, ion, or molecule is at the lowest possible energy level, it and its electrons are said to be in the ground state. If it is at a higher energy level, it is said to be excited, or any electrons that have higher energy than the ground state are excited. An energy level is regarded as degenerate if there is more than one measurable quantum mechanical state associated with it.

== Explanation ==
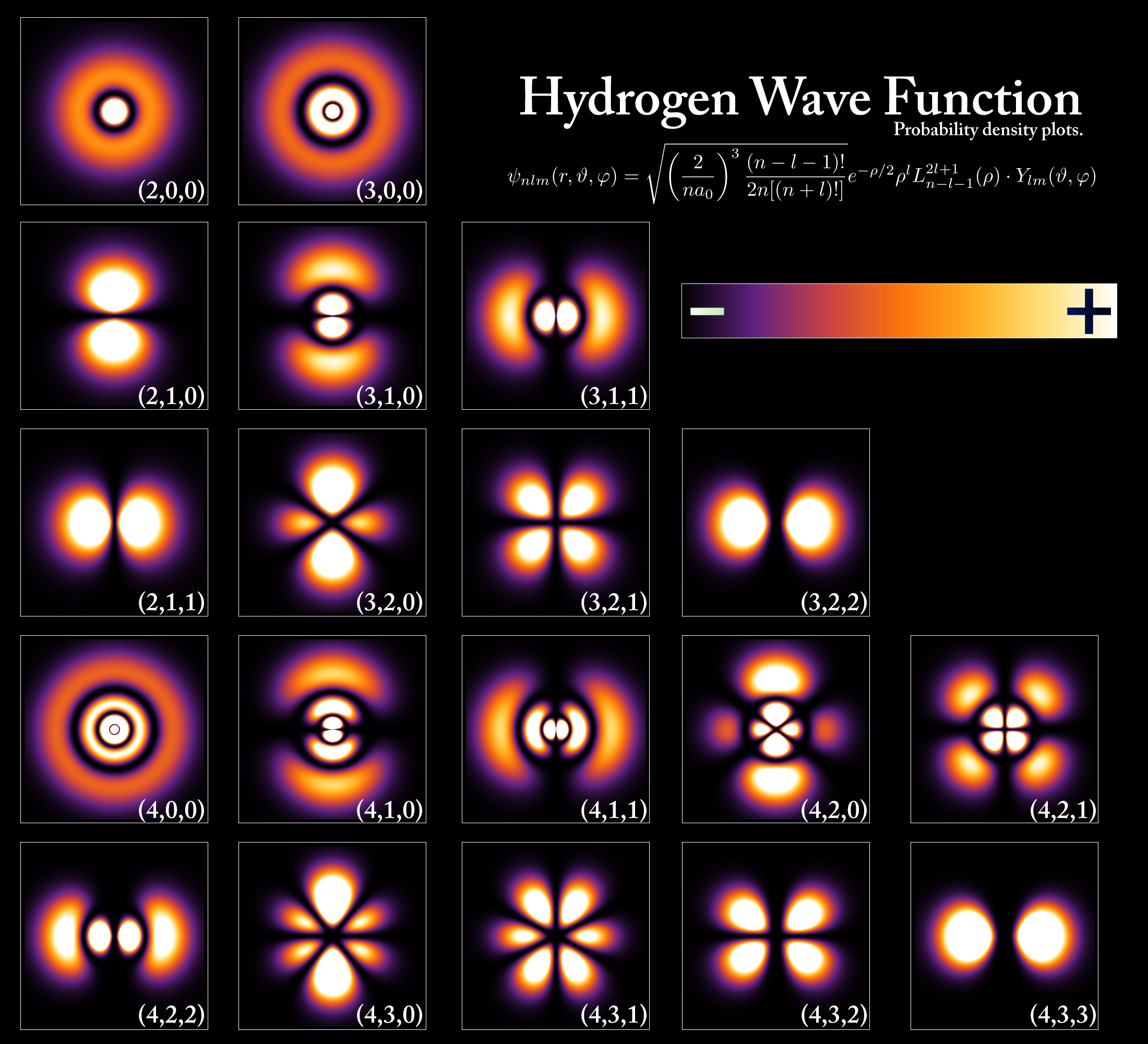
Wavefunctions of a hydrogen atom, showing the probability of finding the electron in the space around the nucleus. Each stationary state defines a specific energy level of the atom.

Quantized energy levels result from the wave behavior of particles, which gives a relationship between a particle's energy and its wavelength. For a confined particle such as an electron in an atom, the wave functions that have well defined energies have the form of a standing wave. States having well-defined energies are called stationary states because they are the states that do not change in time. Informally, these states correspond to a whole number of wavelengths of the wavefunction along a closed path (a path that ends where it started), such as a circular orbit around an atom, where the number of wavelengths gives the type of atomic orbital (0 for s-orbitals, 1 for p-orbitals and so on). Elementary examples that show mathematically how energy levels come about are the particle in a box and the quantum harmonic oscillator.

Any superposition (linear combination) of energy states is also a quantum state, but such states change with time and do not have well-defined energies. A measurement of the energy results in the collapse of the wavefunction, which results in a new state that consists of just a single energy state. Measurement of the possible energy levels of an object is called spectroscopy.

== History ==
The first evidence of quantization in atoms was the observation of spectral lines in light from the sun in the early 1800s by Joseph von Fraunhofer and William Hyde Wollaston. The notion of energy levels was proposed in 1913 by Danish physicist Niels Bohr in the Bohr theory of the atom. The modern quantum mechanical theory giving an explanation of these energy levels in terms of the Schrödinger equation was advanced by Erwin Schrödinger and Werner Heisenberg in 1926.

== Atoms ==
=== Intrinsic energy levels ===
In the formulas for energy of electrons at various levels given below in an atom, the zero point for energy is set when the electron in question has completely left the atom; i.e. when the electron's principal quantum number n = ∞. When the electron is bound to the atom in any closer value of n, the electron's energy is lower and is considered negative.

==== Orbital state energy level: atom/ion with nucleus + one electron ====
Assume there is one electron in a given atomic orbital in a hydrogen-like atom (ion). The energy of its state is mainly determined by the electrostatic interaction of the (negative) electron with the (positive) nucleus. The energy levels of an electron around a nucleus are given by:

$$E_n = - h c R_{\infty} \frac{Z^2}{n^2}$$

(typically between 1 eV and 10^{3} eV), where R_{∞} is the Rydberg constant, Z is the atomic number, n is the principal quantum number, h is the Planck constant, and c is the speed of light. For hydrogen-like atoms (ions) only, the Rydberg levels depend only on the principal quantum number n.

This equation is obtained from combining the Rydberg formula for any hydrogen-like element (shown below) with E = hν = hc/λ assuming that the principal quantum number n above = n_{1} in the Rydberg formula and n_{2} = ∞ (principal quantum number of the energy level the electron descends from, when emitting a photon). The Rydberg formula was derived from empirical spectroscopic emission data.

$$\frac{1}{\lambda} = RZ^2 \left(\frac{1}{n_1^2}-\frac{1}{n_2^2}\right)$$

An equivalent formula can be derived quantum mechanically from the time-independent Schrödinger equation with a kinetic energy Hamiltonian operator using a wave function as an eigenfunction to obtain the energy levels as eigenvalues, but the Rydberg constant would be replaced by other fundamental physics constants.

==== Electron–electron interactions in atoms ====
If there is more than one electron around the atom, electron–electron interactions raise the energy level. These interactions are often neglected if the spatial overlap of the electron wavefunctions is low.

For multi-electron atoms, interactions between electrons cause the preceding equation to be no longer accurate as stated simply with Z as the atomic number. A simple (though not complete) way to understand this is as a shielding effect, where the outer electrons see an effective nucleus of reduced charge, since the inner electrons are bound tightly to the nucleus and partially cancel its charge. This leads to an approximate correction where Z is substituted with an effective nuclear charge symbolized as Z_{eff} that depends strongly on the principal quantum number.
$$E_{n,\ell} = - h c R_{\infty} \frac{{Z_{\rm eff}}^2}{n^2}$$

In such cases, the orbital types (determined by the azimuthal quantum number l) as well as their levels within the molecule affect Z_{eff} and therefore also affect the various atomic electron energy levels. The Aufbau principle of filling an atom with electrons for an electron configuration takes these differing energy levels into account. For filling an atom with electrons in the ground state, the lowest energy levels are filled first and consistent with the Pauli exclusion principle, the Aufbau principle, and Hund's rule.

==== Fine structure splitting ====
Fine structure arises from relativistic kinetic energy corrections, spin–orbit coupling (an electrodynamic interaction between the electron's spin and motion and the nucleus's electric field) and the Darwin term (contact term interaction of s shell electrons inside the nucleus). These affect the levels by a typical order of magnitude of 10^{−3} eV.

==== Hyperfine structure ====
This even finer structure is due to electron–nucleus spin–spin interaction, resulting in a typical change in the energy levels by a typical order of magnitude of 10^{−4} eV.

=== Energy levels due to external fields ===
==== Zeeman effect ====
There is an interaction energy associated with the magnetic dipole moment, μ_{L}, arising from the electronic orbital angular momentum, L, given by

$$U = -\boldsymbol{\mu}_L\cdot\mathbf{B}$$

with

$$-\boldsymbol{\mu}_L = \dfrac{e\hbar}{2m}\mathbf{L} = \mu_B\mathbf{L}$$.

Additionally taking into account the magnetic momentum arising from the electron spin.

Due to relativistic effects (Dirac equation), there is a magnetic momentum, μ_{S}, arising from the electron spin

$$-\boldsymbol{\mu}_S = -\mu_\text{B} g_S \mathbf{S}$$,

with g_{S} the electron-spin g-factor (about 2), resulting in a total magnetic moment, μ,

$$\boldsymbol{\mu} = \boldsymbol{\mu}_L + \boldsymbol{\mu}_S$$.

The interaction energy therefore becomes

$$U_B = -\boldsymbol{\mu}\cdot\mathbf{B} = \mu_\text{B} B (M_L + g_S M_S)$$.

== Molecules ==
Chemical bonds between atoms in a molecule form because they make the situation more stable for the involved atoms, which generally means the sum energy level for the involved atoms in the molecule is lower than if the atoms were not so bonded. As separate atoms approach each other to covalently bond, their orbitals affect each other's energy levels to form bonding and antibonding molecular orbitals. The energy level of the bonding orbitals is lower, and the energy level of the antibonding orbitals is higher. For the bond in the molecule to be stable, the covalent bonding electrons occupy the lower energy bonding orbital, which may be signified by such symbols as σ or π depending on the situation. Corresponding anti-bonding orbitals can be signified by adding an asterisk to get σ* or π* orbitals. A non-bonding orbital in a molecule is an orbital with electrons in outer shells which do not participate in bonding and its energy level is the same as that of the constituent atom. Such orbitals can be designated as n orbitals. The electrons in an n orbital are typically lone pairs. In polyatomic molecules, different vibrational and rotational energy levels are also involved.

Roughly speaking, a molecular energy state (i.e., an eigenstate of the molecular Hamiltonian) is the sum of the electronic, vibrational, rotational, nuclear, and translational components, such that:
$$E = E_\text{electronic} + E_\text{vibrational} + E_\text{rotational} + E_\text{nuclear} + E_\text{translational}$$
where E_{electronic} is an eigenvalue of the electronic molecular Hamiltonian (the value of the potential energy surface) at the equilibrium geometry of the molecule.

The molecular energy levels are labelled by the molecular term symbols. The specific energies of these components vary with the specific energy state and the substance.

=== Energy level diagrams ===
There are various types of energy level diagrams for bonds between atoms in a molecule.

Examples
Molecular orbital diagrams, Jablonski diagrams, and Franck–Condon diagrams.

== Energy level transitions ==
An increase in energy level from E_{1} to E_{2} resulting from absorption of a photon represented by the red squiggly arrow, and whose energy is h ν.

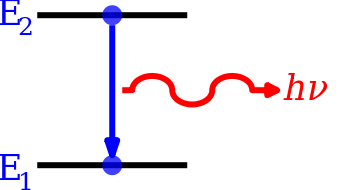
A decrease in energy level from E_{2} to E_{1} resulting in emission of a photon represented by the red squiggly arrow, and whose energy is h ν.

Electrons in atoms and molecules can change (make transitions in) energy levels by emitting or absorbing a photon (of electromagnetic radiation), whose energy must be exactly equal to the energy difference between the two levels.

Electrons can also be completely removed from a chemical species such as an atom, molecule, or ion. Complete removal of an electron from an atom can be a form of ionization, which is effectively moving the electron out to an orbital with an infinite principal quantum number, in effect so far away so as to have practically no more effect on the remaining atom (ion). For various types of atoms, there are 1st, 2nd, 3rd, etc. ionization energies for removing the 1st, then the 2nd, then the 3rd, etc. of the highest energy electrons, respectively, from the atom originally in the ground state. Energy in corresponding opposite quantities can also be released, sometimes in the form of photon energy, when electrons are added to positively charged ions or sometimes atoms. Molecules can also undergo transitions in their vibrational or rotational energy levels. Energy level transitions can also be nonradiative, meaning emission or absorption of a photon is not involved.

If an atom, ion, or molecule is at the lowest possible energy level, it and its electrons are said to be in the ground state. If it is at a higher energy level, it is said to be excited, or any electrons that have higher energy than the ground state are excited. Such a species can be excited to a higher energy level by absorbing a photon whose energy is equal to the energy difference between the levels. Conversely, an excited species can go to a lower energy level by spontaneously emitting a photon equal to the energy difference. A photon's energy is equal to the Planck constant (h) times its frequency (f) and thus is proportional to its frequency, or inversely to its wavelength (λ).

ΔE = hf = hc/λ,

since c, the speed of light, equals fλ.

Correspondingly, many kinds of spectroscopy are based on detecting the frequency or wavelength of the emitted or absorbed photons to provide information on the material analyzed, including information on the energy levels and electronic structure of materials obtained by analyzing the spectrum.

An asterisk is commonly used to designate an excited state. An electron transition in a molecule's bond from a ground state to an excited state may have a designation such as σ → σ*, π → π*, or n → π* meaning excitation of an electron from a σ bonding to a σ antibonding orbital, from a π bonding to a π antibonding orbital, or from an n non-bonding to a π antibonding orbital. Reverse electron transitions for all these types of excited molecules are also possible to return to their ground states, which can be designated as σ* → σ, π* → π, or π* → n.

A transition in an energy level of an electron in a molecule may be combined with a vibrational transition and called a vibronic transition. A vibrational and rotational transition may be combined by rovibrational coupling. In rovibronic coupling, electron transitions are simultaneously combined with both vibrational and rotational transitions. Photons involved in transitions may have energy of various ranges in the electromagnetic spectrum, such as X-ray, ultraviolet, visible light, infrared, or microwave radiation, depending on the type of transition. In a very general way, energy level differences between electronic states are larger, differences between vibrational levels are intermediate, and differences between rotational levels are smaller, although there can be overlap. Translational energy levels are practically continuous and can be calculated as kinetic energy using classical mechanics.

Higher temperature causes fluid atoms and molecules to move faster increasing their translational energy, and thermally excites molecules to higher average amplitudes of vibrational and rotational modes (excites the molecules to higher internal energy levels). This means that as temperature rises, translational, vibrational, and rotational contributions to molecular heat capacity let molecules absorb heat and hold more internal energy. Conduction of heat typically occurs as molecules or atoms collide transferring the heat between each other. At even higher temperatures, electrons can be thermally excited to higher energy orbitals in atoms or molecules. A subsequent drop of an electron to a lower energy level can release a photon, causing a possibly coloured glow.

An electron further from the nucleus has higher potential energy than an electron closer to the nucleus, thus it becomes less bound to the nucleus, since its potential energy is negative and inversely dependent on its distance from the nucleus.

== Crystalline materials ==
Crystalline solids are found to have energy bands, instead of or in addition to energy levels. Electrons can take on any energy within an unfilled band. At first this appears to be an exception to the requirement for energy levels. However, as shown in band theory, energy bands are actually made up of many discrete energy levels which are too close together to resolve. Within a band the number of levels is of the order of the number of atoms in the crystal, so although electrons are actually restricted to these energies, they appear to be able to take on a continuum of values. The important energy levels in a crystal are the top of the valence band, the bottom of the conduction band, the Fermi level, the vacuum level, and the energy levels of any defect states in the crystal.

== See also ==
- Perturbation theory (quantum mechanics)
- Atomic clock
- Computational chemistry
