= Bond order =

Difference between the number of bonds and anti-bonds in a molecule

In chemistry, bond order is a formal measure of the multiplicity of a covalent bond between two atoms. As introduced by Gerhard Herzberg, building off of work by R. S. Mulliken and Friedrich Hund, bond order is defined as the difference between the numbers of electron pairs in bonding and antibonding molecular orbitals.

Bond order gives a rough indication of the stability of a bond. Isoelectronic species, such as CO and N_{2}, have the same bond order.

== Examples ==
The bond order itself is the number of electron pairs (covalent bonds) between two atoms. For example, in diatomic nitrogen N≡N, the bond order between the two nitrogen atoms is 3 (triple bond). In acetylene H–C≡C–H, the bond order between the two carbon atoms is also 3, and the C–H bond order is 1 (single bond). In carbon monoxide, ^{−}C≡O^{+}, the bond order between carbon and oxygen is 3. In thiazyl trifluoride N≡SF_{3}, the bond order between sulfur and nitrogen is 3, and between sulfur and fluorine is 1. In diatomic oxygen O=O the bond order is 2 (double bond). In ethylene H_{2}C=CH_{2} the bond order between the two carbon atoms is also 2. The bond order between carbon and oxygen in carbon dioxide O=C=O is also 2. In phosgene O=CCl_{2}, the bond order between carbon and oxygen is 2, and between carbon and chlorine is 1.

In some molecules, bond orders can be 4 (quadruple bond), 5 (quintuple bond) or even 6 (sextuple bond). For example, potassium octachlorodimolybdate salt (K_{4}[Mo_{2}Cl_{8}]) contains the [Cl_{4}Mo≣MoCl_{4}]^{4−} anion, in which the two Mo atoms are linked to each other by a bond with an order of 4. Each Mo atom is linked to four Cl^{−} ligands by a bond with an order of 1. The compound (terphenyl)–CrCr–(terphenyl) contains two chromium atoms linked to each other by a bond with an order of 5, and each chromium atom is linked to one terphenyl ligand by a single bond. A bond of order 6 is detected in ditungsten molecules W_{2}, which exist only in a gaseous phase.

=== Non-integer bond orders ===
In molecules which have resonance, bond order may not be an integer. In benzene, the delocalized molecular orbitals contain 6 pi electrons over six carbons, essentially yielding half a pi bond together with the sigma bond for each pair of carbon atoms, giving a calculated bond order of 1.5 (one and a half bond). Furthermore, bond orders of 1.1 (eleven tenths bond), 4/3 (or 1.333333..., four thirds bond) or 0.5 (half bond), for example, can occur in some molecules and essentially refer to bond strength relative to bonds with order 1. In the nitrate anion (NO^{−}_{3}), the bond order for each bond between nitrogen and oxygen is 4/3 (or 1.333333...).

Bonding in a dihydrogen cation H^{+}_{2} can be described as a covalent one-electron bond, thus the bonding between the two hydrogen atoms has bond order of 0.5.

There are cases where alkene bond order can be non-integer without resonance. Notable examples are "cubene" and "quadricyclene". As reported by Garg and Houk in 2026, the bond orders of these unusual alkenes approach 1.5 due to hyperpyramidalization.

== Bond order in molecular orbital theory ==
In molecular orbital theory, bond order is defined as half the difference between the number of bonding electrons and the number of antibonding electrons as per the equation below. This often but not always yields similar results for bonds near their equilibrium lengths, but it does not work for stretched bonds. Bond order is also an index of bond strength and is also used extensively in valence bond theory.

bond order = (number of bonding electrons − number of antibonding electrons)/2

Generally, the higher the bond order, the stronger the bond. Bond orders of one-half may be stable, as shown by the stability of H^{+}_{2} (bond length 106 pm, bond energy 269 kJ/mol) and He^{+}_{2} (bond length 108 pm, bond energy 251 kJ/mol).

Hückel molecular orbital theory offers another approach for defining bond orders based on molecular orbital coefficients, for planar molecules with delocalized π bonding. The theory divides bonding into a sigma framework and a pi system. The π-bond order between atoms r and s derived from Hückel theory was defined by Charles Coulson by using the orbital coefficients of the Hückel MOs:

$$p_{rs} = \sum_i n_ic_{ri}c_{si}$$,

Here the sum extends over π molecular orbitals only, and n_{i} is the number of electrons occupying orbital i with coefficients c_{ri} and c_{si} on atoms r and s respectively. Assuming a bond order contribution of 1 from the sigma component this gives a total bond order (σ + π) of 5/3 = 1.67 for benzene, rather than the commonly cited bond order of 1.5, showing some degree of ambiguity in how the concept of bond order is defined.

For more elaborate forms of molecular orbital theory involving larger basis sets, still other definitions have been proposed. A standard quantum mechanical definition for bond order has been debated for a long time. A comprehensive method to compute bond orders from quantum chemistry calculations was published in 2017.

== Other definitions ==
The bond order concept is used in molecular dynamics and bond order potentials. The magnitude of the bond order is associated with the bond length. According to Linus Pauling in 1947, the bond order between atoms i and j is experimentally described as

$$s_{ij} = \exp{\left[\frac{d_{1} - d_{ij}}{b}\right]}$$

where d_{1} is the single bond length, d_{ij} is the bond length experimentally measured, and b is a constant, depending on the atoms. Pauling suggested a value of 0.353 Å for b, for carbon–carbon bonds in the original equation:

$$d_{1} - d_{ij} = 0.353~\text{ln}(s_{ij})$$

The value of the constant b depends on the atoms. This definition of bond order is somewhat ad hoc and only easy to apply for diatomic molecules.
