= Antibonding orbital =

Molecular orbital which weakens chemical bonding

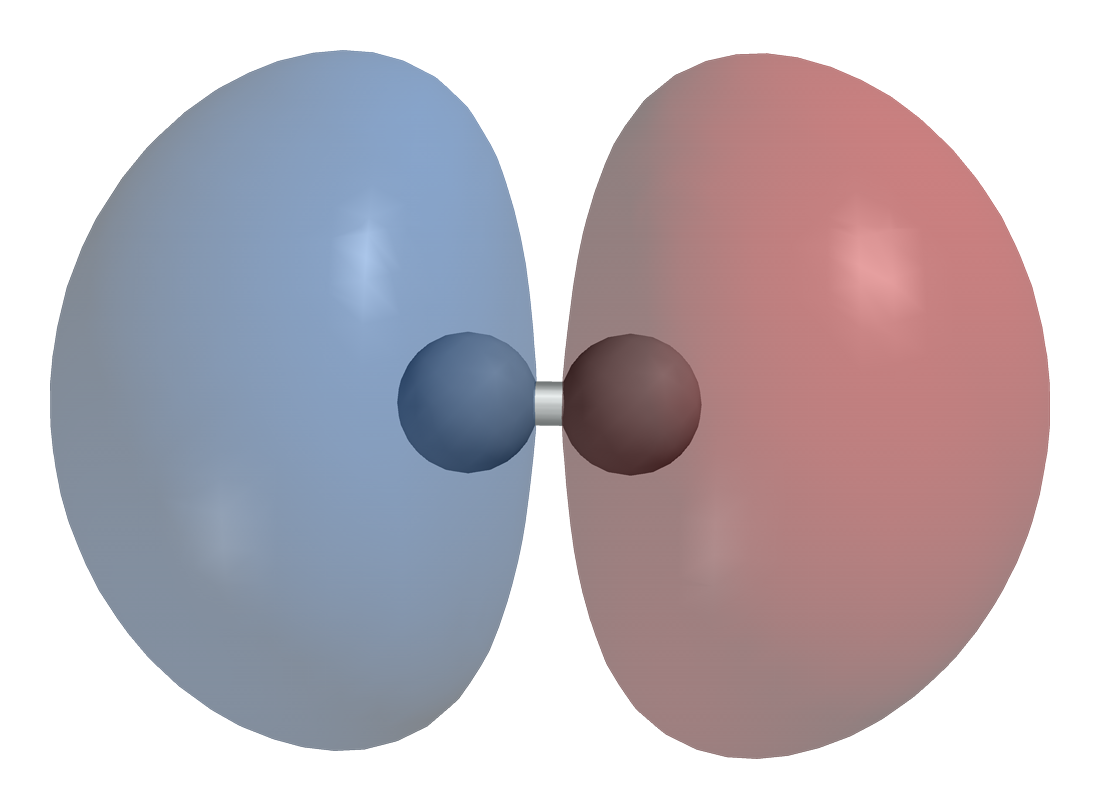
H_{2} 1sσ* antibonding molecular orbital

In theoretical chemistry, an antibonding orbital is a type of molecular orbital that weakens the chemical bond between two atoms and helps to raise the energy of the molecule relative to the separated atoms. Such an orbital has one or more nodes in the bonding region between the nuclei. The density of the electrons in the orbital is concentrated outside the bonding region and acts to pull one nucleus away from the other and tends to cause mutual repulsion between the two atoms. This is in contrast to a bonding molecular orbital, which has a lower energy than that of the separate atoms, and is responsible for chemical bonds.

== Diatomic molecules ==
Antibonding molecular orbitals (MOs) are normally higher in energy than bonding molecular orbitals. Bonding and antibonding orbitals form when atoms combine into molecules. If two hydrogen atoms are initially far apart, they have identical atomic orbitals. However, as the spacing between the two atoms becomes smaller, the electron wave functions begin to overlap. The Pauli exclusion principle prohibits any two electrons (e-) in a molecule from having the same set of quantum numbers. Therefore each original atomic orbital of the isolated atoms (for example, the ground state energy level, 1s) splits into two molecular orbitals belonging to the pair, one lower in energy than the original atomic level and one higher. The orbital which is in a lower energy state than the orbitals of the separate atoms is the bonding orbital, which is more stable and promotes the bonding of the two H atoms into H_{2}. The higher-energy orbital is the antibonding orbital, which is less stable and opposes bonding if it is occupied. In a molecule such as H_{2}, the two electrons normally occupy the lower-energy bonding orbital, so that the molecule is more stable than the separate H atoms.

He_{2} electron configuration. The four electrons occupy one bonding orbital at lower energy, and one antibonding orbital at higher energy than the atomic orbitals.

A molecular orbital becomes antibonding when there is less electron density between the two nuclei than there would be if there were no bonding interaction at all. When a molecular orbital changes sign (from positive to negative) at a nodal plane between two atoms, it is said to be antibonding with respect to those atoms. Antibonding orbitals are often labelled with an asterisk (*) on molecular orbital diagrams.

In homonuclear diatomic molecules, σ* (sigma star) antibonding orbitals have no nodal planes passing through the two nuclei, like sigma bonds, and π* (pi star) orbitals have one nodal plane passing through the two nuclei, like pi bonds. The Pauli exclusion principle dictates that no two electrons in an interacting system may have the same quantum state. If the bonding orbitals are filled, then any additional electrons will occupy antibonding orbitals. This occurs in the He_{2} molecule, in which both the 1sσ and 1sσ* orbitals are filled. Since the antibonding orbital is more antibonding than the bonding orbital is bonding—in other words, the magnitude of destabilization from filling the antibonding orbitals is greater than that of the stabilization of filling the bonding orbitals—thus the molecule has a higher energy than two separated helium atoms, and it is unstable.

== Polyatomic molecules ==
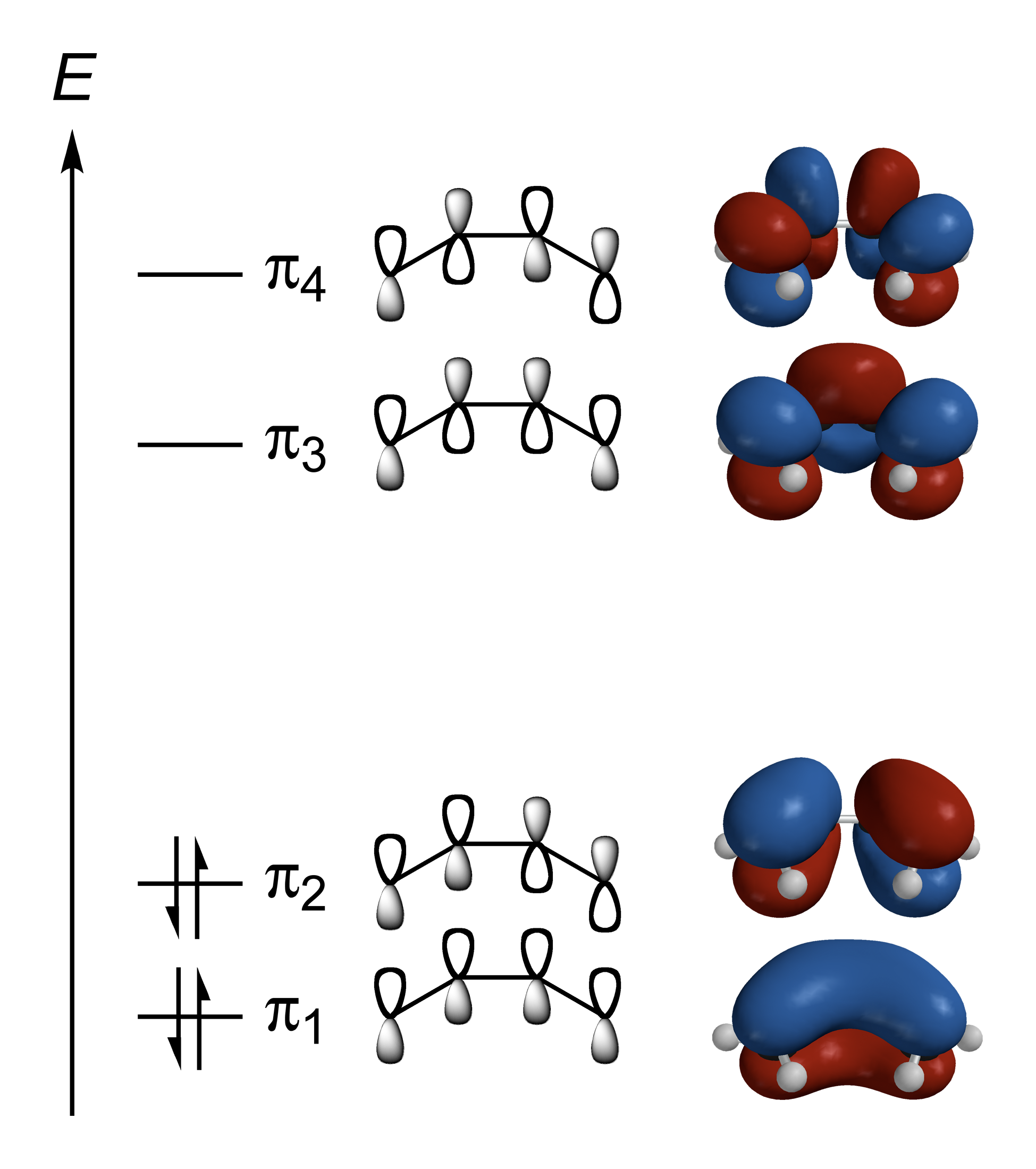
Butadiene pi molecular orbitals. The two colors show opposite signs of the wavefunction.

In molecules with several atoms, some orbitals may be delocalized over more than two atoms. A particular molecular orbital may be bonding with respect to some adjacent pairs of atoms and antibonding with respect to other pairs. If the bonding interactions outnumber the antibonding interactions, the MO is said to be bonding, whereas, if the antibonding interactions outnumber the bonding interactions, the molecular orbital is said to be antibonding.

For example, butadiene has pi orbitals which are delocalized over all four carbon atoms. There are two bonding pi orbitals which are occupied in the ground state: π_{1} is bonding between all carbons, while π_{2} is bonding between C_{1} and C_{2} and between C_{3} and C_{4}, and antibonding between C_{2} and C_{3}. There are also antibonding pi orbitals with two and three antibonding interactions as shown in the diagram; these are vacant in the ground state, but may be occupied in excited states.

Similarly benzene with six carbon atoms has three bonding pi orbitals and three antibonding pi orbitals. Since each carbon atom contributes one electron to the π-system of benzene, there are six pi electrons which fill the three lowest-energy pi molecular orbitals (the bonding pi orbitals).

Antibonding orbitals are also important for explaining chemical reactions in terms of molecular orbital theory. Roald Hoffmann and Kenichi Fukui shared the 1981 Nobel Prize in Chemistry for their work and further development of qualitative molecular orbital explanations for chemical reactions.

== See also ==
- Bonding molecular orbital
- Valence and conduction bands
- Valence bond theory
- Molecular orbital theory
- Conjugated system
