= Sigma bond =

Covalent chemical bond

σ bond between two atoms: localization of electron density

In chemistry, sigma bonds (σ bonds) or sigma overlap are the strongest type of covalent chemical bond. They are formed by head-on overlapping between atomic orbitals along the internuclear axis. Sigma bonding is most simply defined for diatomic molecules using the language and tools of symmetry groups. In this formal approach, a σ-bond is symmetrical with respect to rotation about the bond axis. By this definition, common forms of sigma bonds are s+s, p_{z}+p_{z}, s+p_{z} and d_{z^{2}}+d_{z^{2}} (where z is defined as the axis of the bond or the internuclear axis). Quantum theory also indicates that molecular orbitals (MO) of identical symmetry actually mix or hybridize. As a practical consequence of this mixing of diatomic molecules, the wavefunctions s+s and p_{z}+p_{z} molecular orbitals become blended. The extent of this mixing (or hybridization or blending) depends on the relative energies of the MOs of like symmetry.

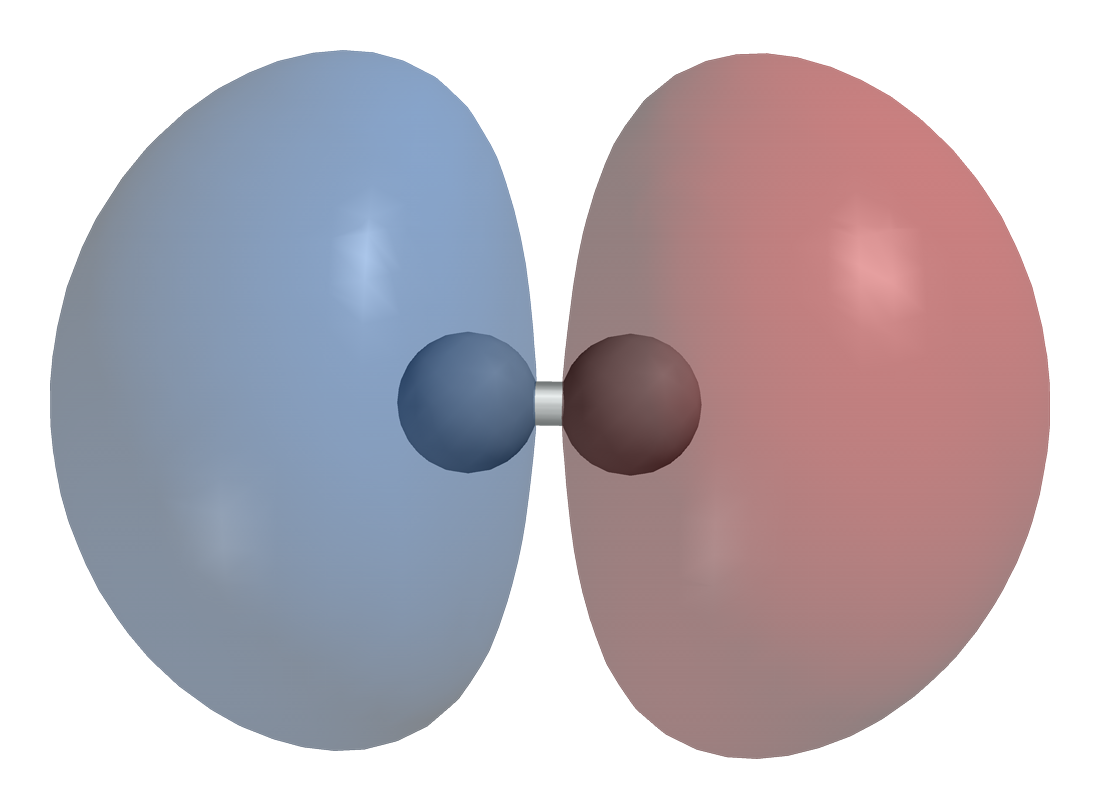
1sσ* antibonding molecular orbital in H_{2} with nodal plane

For homodiatomics (homonuclear diatomic molecules), bonding σ orbitals have no nodal planes at which the wavefunction is zero, either between the bonded atoms or passing through the bonded atoms. The corresponding antibonding, or σ* orbital, is defined by the presence of one nodal plane between the two bonded atoms.

Sigma bonds are the strongest type of covalent bonds due to the direct overlap of orbitals, and the electrons in these bonds are sometimes referred to as sigma electrons.

The symbol σ is the Greek letter sigma. When viewed down the bond axis, a σ MO has a circular symmetry, hence resembling a similarly sounding "s" atomic orbital.

Typically, a single bond is a sigma bond while a multiple bond is composed of one sigma bond together with pi or other bonds. A double bond has one sigma plus one pi bond, and a triple bond has one sigma plus two pi bonds.

——
————————————————
—————

Atomic

orbitals

Symmetric (s–s and p–p)
sigma bonds between atomic orbitals
A pi bond,
for comparison
——
————————————————
—————
σ_{s–hybrid}
σ_{s–p}

== Polyatomic molecules ==
Sigma bonds are obtained by head-on overlapping of atomic orbitals. The concept of sigma bonding is extended to describe bonding interactions involving overlap of a single lobe of one orbital with a single lobe of another. For example, propane is described as consisting of ten sigma bonds, one each for the two C−C bonds and one each for the eight C−H bonds.

== Multiple-bonded complexes ==
Transition metal complexes that feature multiple bonds, such as the dihydrogen complex, have sigma bonds between the multiple bonded atoms. These sigma bonds can be supplemented with other bonding interactions, such as π-back donation, as in the case of W(CO)_{3}(PCy_{3})_{2}(H_{2}), and even δ-bonds, as in the case of chromium(II) acetate.

== Organic molecules ==
Organic molecules are often cyclic compounds containing one or more rings, such as benzene, and are often made up of many sigma bonds along with pi bonds. According to the sigma bond rule, the number of sigma bonds in a molecule is equivalent to the number of atoms plus the number of rings minus one.

N_{σ} = N_{atoms} + N_{rings} − 1

This rule is a special-case application of the Euler characteristic of the graph which represents the molecule.

A molecule with no rings can be represented as a tree with a number of bonds equal to the number of atoms minus one (as in dihydrogen, H_{2}, with only one sigma bond, or ammonia, NH_{3}, with 3 sigma bonds). There is no more than 1 sigma bond between any two atoms.

Molecules with rings have additional sigma bonds, such as benzene rings, which have 6 C−C sigma bonds within the ring for 6 carbon atoms. The anthracene molecule, C_{14}H_{10}, has three rings so that the rule gives the number of sigma bonds as 24 + 3 − 1 = 26. In this case there are 16 C−C sigma bonds and 10 C−H bonds.

This rule fails in the case of molecules which, when drawn flat on paper, have a different number of rings than the molecule actually has - for example, Buckminsterfullerene, C_{60}, which has 32 rings, 60 atoms, and 90 sigma bonds, one for each pair of bonded atoms; however, 60 + 32 − 1 = 91, not 90. This is because the sigma rule is a special case of the Euler characteristic, where each ring is considered a face, each sigma bond is an edge, and each atom is a vertex. Ordinarily, one extra face is assigned to the space not inside any ring, but when Buckminsterfullerene is drawn flat without any crossings, one of the rings makes up the outer pentagon; the inside of that ring is the outside of the graph. This rule fails further when considering other shapes - toroidal fullerenes will obey the rule that the number of sigma bonds in a molecule is exactly the number of atoms plus the number of rings, as will nanotubes - which, when drawn flat as if looking through one from the end, will have a face in the middle, corresponding to the far end of the nanotube, which is not a ring, and a face corresponding to the outside.

== See also ==
- Bond strength
- Molecular geometry
- Pi bond
