= Bonding orbital =

Quantum-mechanical explanation of chemical bonding

In theoretical chemistry, the bonding orbital is used in molecular orbital (MO) theory to describe the attractive interactions between the atomic orbitals of two or more atoms in a molecule. In MO theory, electrons are portrayed to move in waves. When more than one of these waves come close together, the in-phase combination of these waves produces an interaction that leads to a species that is greatly stabilized. The result of the waves' constructive interference causes the density of the electrons to be found within the binding region, creating a stable bond between the two species.

== Diatomic molecules ==
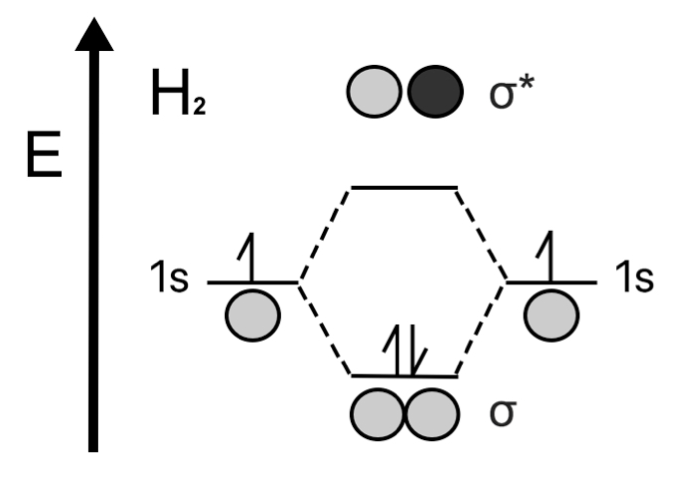
The MO diagram for dihydrogen

In the classic example of the H_{2} MO, the two separate H atoms have identical atomic orbitals. When creating the molecule dihydrogen, the individual valence orbitals, 1s, either: merge in phase to get bonding orbitals, where the electron density is in between the nuclei of the atoms; or, merge out of phase to get antibonding orbitals, where the electron density is everywhere around the atom except for the space between the nuclei of the two atoms. Bonding orbitals lead to a more stable species than when the two hydrogens are monatomic. Antibonding orbitals are less stable because, with very little to no electron density in the middle, the two nuclei (holding the same charge) repulse each other. Therefore, it would require more energy to hold the two atoms together through the antibonding orbital. Each electron in the valence 1s shell of hydrogen come together to fill in the stabilizing bonding orbital. So, hydrogen prefers to exist as a diatomic, and not monatomic, molecule.

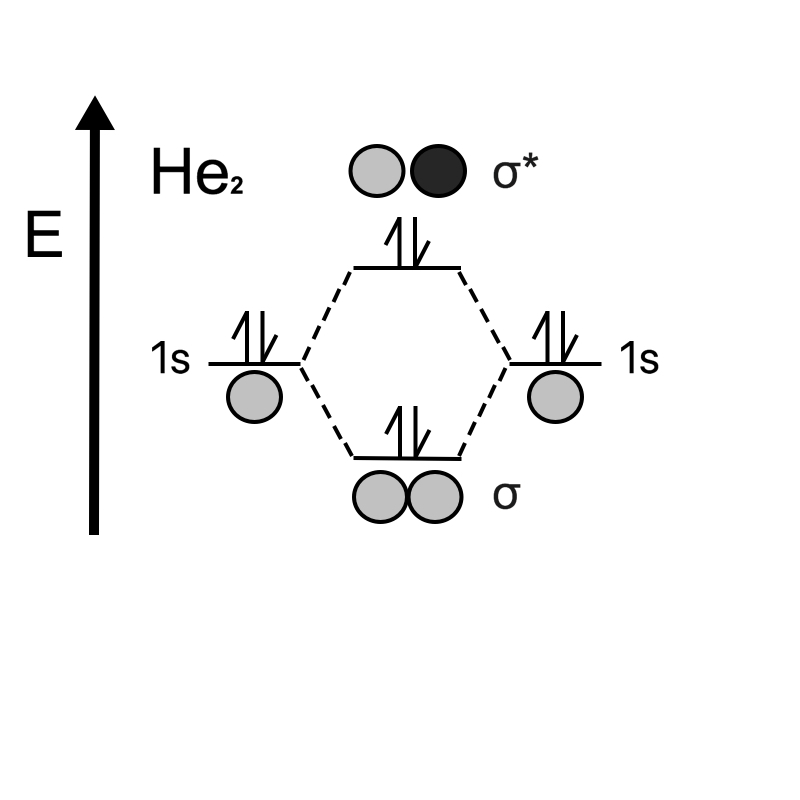
The MO diagram for helium

When looking at helium, the atom holds two electrons in each valence 1s shell. When the two atomic orbitals come together, they first fill in the bonding orbital with two electrons, but unlike hydrogen, it has two electrons left, which must then go to the antibonding orbital. The instability of the antibonding orbital cancels out the stabilizing effect provided by the bonding orbital; therefore, dihelium's bond order is 0. This is why helium would prefer to be monatomic over diatomic.

== Polyatomic molecules ==
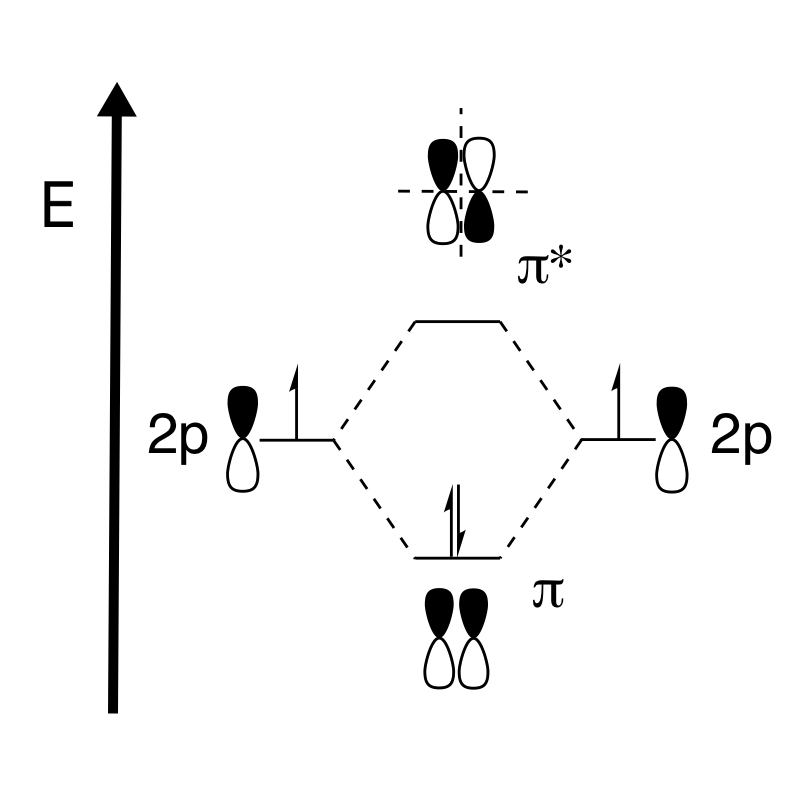
The MO diagram for a pi bond

=== Bonding MOs of pi bonds ===
Pi bonds are created by the "side-on" interactions of the orbitals. Once again, in molecular orbitals, bonding pi (π) electrons occur when the interaction of the two π atomic orbitals are in-phase. In this case, the electron density of the π orbitals needs to be symmetric along the mirror plane in order to create the bonding interaction. Asymmetry along the mirror plane will lead to a node in that plane and is described in the antibonding orbital, π*.

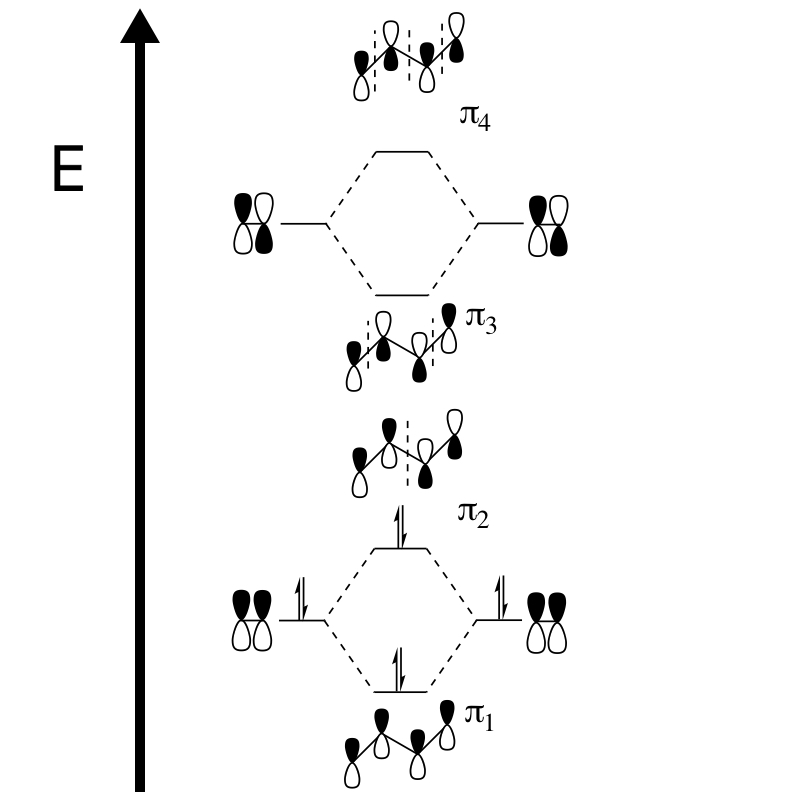
The MO diagram for butadiene

An example of a MO of a simple conjugated π system is butadiene. To create the MO for butadiene, the resulting π and π* orbitals of the previously described system will interact with each other. This mixing will result in the creation of 4 group orbitals (which can also be used to describe the π MO of any diene): π_{1} contains no vertical nodes, π_{2} contains one and both are considered bonding orbitals; π_{3} contains 2 vertical nodes, π_{4} contains 3 and are both considered antibonding orbitals.

=== Localized molecular orbitals ===
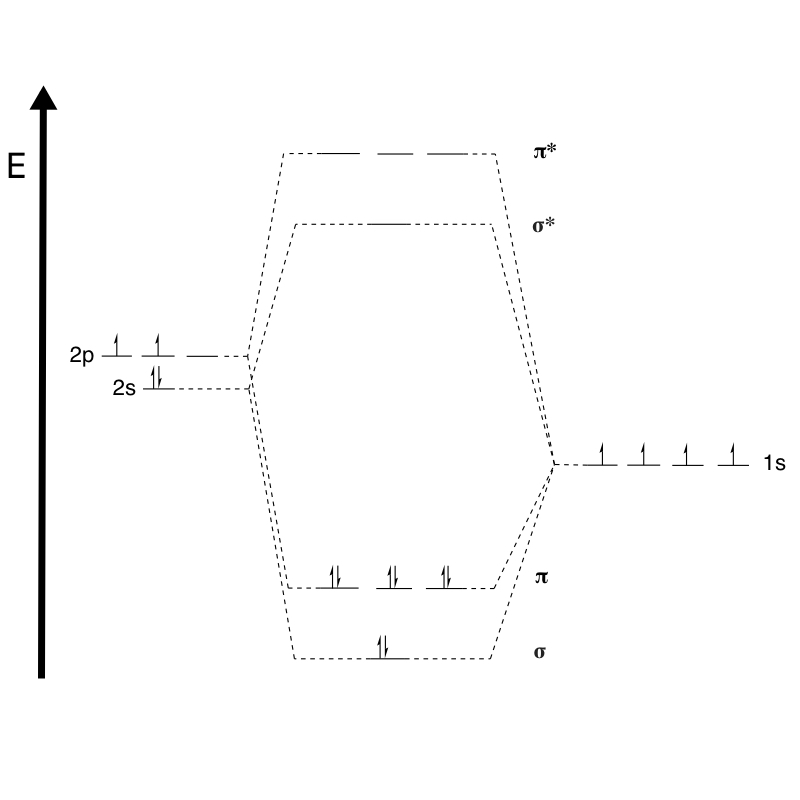
The MO diagram for methane

The spherical 3D shape of s orbitals have no directionality in space and p_{x}, p_{y}, and p_{z} orbitals are all 90^{o} with respect to each other. Therefore, in order to obtain orbitals corresponding to chemical bonds to describe chemical reactions, Edmiston and Ruedenberg pioneered the development of localization procedures. For example, in CH_{4}, the four electrons from the 1s orbitals of the hydrogen atoms and the valence electrons from the carbon atom (2 in s and 2 in p) occupy the bonding molecular orbitals, σ and π. The delocalized MOs of the carbon atom in the molecule of methane can then be localized to give four sp^{3} hybrid orbitals.

== Applications ==
Molecular orbitals and, more specifically, the bonding orbital is a theory that is taught in all different areas of chemistry, from organic to physical and even analytical, because it is widely applicable. Organic chemists use molecular orbital theory in their thought rationale for reactions; analytical chemists use it in different spectroscopy methods; physical chemists use it in calculations; it is even seen in materials chemistry through band theory—an extension of molecular orbital theory.
