= Isovalent hybridization =

In chemistry, isovalent or second order hybridization is an extension of orbital hybridization, the mixing of atomic orbitals into hybrid orbitals which can form chemical bonds, to include fractional numbers of atomic orbitals of each type (s, p, d). It allows for a quantitative depiction of bond formation when the molecular geometry deviates from ideal bond angles.

Only bonding with 4 equivalent substituents results in exactly sp^{3} hybridization. For molecules with different substituents, we can use isovalent hybridization to rationalize the differences in bond angles between different atoms. In the molecule methyl fluoride for example, the HCF bond angle (108.73°) is less than the HCH bond angle (110.2°). This difference can be attributed to more p character in the C−F bonding and more s character in the C−H bonding orbitals. The hybridisation of bond orbitals is determined by Bent's rule: "Atomic s character concentrates in orbitals directed toward electropositive substituents".

The bond length between similar atoms also shortens with increasing s character. For example, the C−H bond length is 110.2 pm in ethane, 108.5 pm in ethylene and 106.1 pm in acetylene, with carbon hybridizations sp^{3} (25% s), sp^{2} (33% s) and sp (50% s) respectively.

To determine the degree of hybridization of each bond one can utilize a hybridization parameter (λ). For hybrids of s and p orbitals, this is the coefficient $(\lambda)$multiplying the p orbital when the hybrid orbital is written in the form $(s + \lambda p)$. The square of the hybridization parameter equals the hybridization index (n) of an sp^{n} orbital. $n = \lambda^2$.

The fractional s character of orbital i is $\frac{1}{1+ \lambda_i^2}$, and the s character of all the hybrid orbitals must sum to one, so that $\sum_{i} \frac{1}{1+ \lambda_i^2} = 1$

The fractional p character of orbital i is $\frac{\lambda_i^2}{1+\lambda_i^2}$, and the p character of all the hybrid orbitals sums to the number of p orbitals involved in the formation of hybrids:

$$\sum_{i} \frac{\lambda_i^2}{1+\lambda_i^2} = 1,2,\ \mathrm{or}\ 3$$

These hybridization parameters can then be related to physical properties like bond angles. Using the two bonding atomic orbitals i and j we are able to find the magnitude of the interorbital angle. The orthogonality condition implies the relation known as Coulson's theorem:

$$\ 1 + \lambda_i \lambda_j \cos \theta_{ij} = 0$$

For two identical ligands the following equation can be utilized:

$$\ 1 + \lambda_i^2 \cos \theta_{ii} = 0$$

The hybridization index cannot be measured directly in any way. However, one can find it indirectly by measuring specific physical properties. Because nuclear spins are coupled through bonding electrons, and the electron penetration to the nucleus is dependent on s character of the hybrid orbital used in bonding, J-coupling constants determined through NMR spectroscopy is a convenient experimental parameter that can be used to estimate the hybridization index of orbitals on carbon. The relationships for one-bond ^{13}C-^{1}H and ^{13}C-^{13}C coupling are

$\ ^1J_{^{13}\mathrm{C}-^{1}\mathrm{H}} = \frac {500\ \mathrm{Hz}}{1 + \lambda_i^2}= (500\ \mathrm{Hz})\chi_{\mathrm{s}}(i)$ and $\ ^1J_{^{13}\mathrm{C}-^{13}\mathrm{C}} = (550\ \mathrm{Hz}) \Big(\frac {1}{1 + \lambda_i^2}\Big)\Big(\frac {1}{1 + \lambda_j^2}\Big)= (550\ \mathrm{Hz})\chi_{\mathrm{s}}(i)\chi_{\mathrm{s}}(j)$,

where ^{1}J_{X-Y} is the one-bond NMR spin-spin coupling constant between nuclei X and Y and χ_{S}(α) is the s character of orbital α on carbon, expressed as a fraction of unity.

As an application, the ^{13}C-^{1}H coupling constants show that for the cycloalkanes, the amount of s character in the carbon hybrid orbital employed in the C-H bond decreases as the ring size increases. The value of ^{1}J_{^{13}C-^{1}H} for cyclopropane, cyclobutane and cyclopentane are 161, 134, and 128 Hz, respectively. This is a consequence of the fact that the C-C bonds in small, strained rings (cyclopropane and cyclobutane) employ excess p character to accommodate their molecular geometries (these bonds are famously known as 'banana bonds'). In order to conserve the total number of s and p orbitals used in hybridization for each carbon, the hybrid orbital used to form the C-H bonds must in turn compensate by taking on more s character. Experimentally, this is also demonstrated by the significantly higher acidity of cyclopropane (pK_{a} ~ 46) compared to, for instance, cyclohexane (pK_{a} ~ 52).
