= VALBOND =

In molecular mechanics, VALBOND is a method for computing the angle bending energy that is based on valence bond theory. It is based on orbital strength functions, which are maximized when the hybrid orbitals on the atom are orthogonal. The hybridization of the bonding orbitals are obtained from empirical formulas based on Bent's rule, which relates the preference towards p character with electronegativity.

The VALBOND functions are suitable for describing the energy of bond angle distortion not only around the equilibrium angles, but also at very large distortions. This represents an advantage over the simpler harmonic oscillator approximation used by many force fields, and allows the VALBOND method to handle hypervalent molecules and transition metal complexes. The VALBOND energy term has been combined with force fields such as CHARMM and UFF to provide a complete functional form that includes also bond stretching, torsions, and non-bonded interactions.

== Functional form ==
=== Non-hypervalent molecules ===
For an angle α between normal (non-hypervalent) bonds involving an sp^{m}d^{n} hybrid orbital, the energy contribution is

$$E(\alpha ) = k(S^{max} - S(\alpha))$$,

where k is an empirical scaling factor that depends on the elements involved in the bond, S^{max}, the maximum strength function, is

$$S^{max} = \sqrt{\frac{1}{1+m+n}} (1 + \sqrt{3m} + \sqrt{5n})$$

and S(α) is the strength function

$$S(\alpha ) = S^{max} \sqrt{1 - \frac{1- \sqrt{1 - \Delta ^2}}{2}}$$

which depends on the nonorthogonality integral Δ:

$$\Delta = \frac{1}{1+m+n} \left [ 1+m \cos \alpha + \frac{n}{2}(3 \cos ^2 \alpha -1) \right ]$$

The energy contribution is added twice, once per each of the bonding orbitals involved in the angle (which may have different hybridizations and different values for k).

For non-hypervalent p-block atoms, the hybridization value n is zero (no d-orbital contribution), and m is obtained as %p(1-%p), where %p is the p character of the orbital obtained from

$$\%p_i = \frac{n_p wt_i}{\sum_{j} wt_j}$$

where the sum over j includes all ligands, lone pairs, and radicals on the atom, n_{p} is the "gross hybridization" (for example, for an "sp^{2}" atom, n_{p} = 2). The weight wt_{i} depends on the two elements involved in the bond (or just one for lone pair or radicals), and represents the preference for p character of different elements. The values of the weights are empirical, but can be rationalized in terms of Bent's rule.

=== Hypervalent molecules ===
For hypervalent molecules, the energy is represented as a combination of VALBOND configurations, which are akin to resonance structures that place three-center four-electron bonds (3c4e) in different ways. For example, ClF_{3} is represented as having one "normal" two-center bond and one 3c4e bond. There are three different configurations for ClF_{3}, each one using a different Cl-F bond as the two-center bond. For more complicated systems the number of combinations increases rapidly; SF_{6} has 45 configurations.

$$E_{tot} = \sum_j c_j E_j$$

where the sum is over all configurations j, and the coefficient c_{j} is defined by the function

$$c_j = \frac{\displaystyle \prod_{i=1}^{hype} \cos^2 \alpha_i}{\displaystyle \sum_{j=1}^{config} \prod_{i=1}^{hype} \cos^2 \alpha_i}$$

where "hype" refers to the 3c4e bonds. This function ensures that the configurations where the 3c4e bonds are linear are favored.

The energy terms are modified by multiplying them by a bond order factor, BOF, which is the product of the formal bond orders of the two bonds involved in the angle (for 3c4e bonds, the bond order is 0.5). For 3c4e bonds, the energy is calculated as

$$E(\alpha) = BOF \times k_{\alpha} [1-\Delta(\alpha + \pi)^2]$$

where Δ is again the non-orthogonality function, but here the angle α is offset by 180 degrees (π radians).

Finally, to ensure that the axial vs equatorial preference of different ligands in hypervalent compounds is reproduced, an "offset energy" term is subtracted. It has the form

$$E_{offset} = \sum_{i=1}^{config} c_i \sum_{j=1}^{hype} \frac{EN_{ija} + EN_{ijb}}{2}$$

where the EN terms depend on the electronegativity difference between the ligand and the central atom as follows:

$$EN_{ija} = 30 \times (en_{lig} - en_{c.a.}) \times ss$$

where ss is 1 if the electronegativity difference is positive and 2 if it is negative.

For p-block hypervalent molecules, d orbitals are not used, so n = 0. The p contribution m is estimated from ab initio quantum chemistry methods and a natural bond orbital (NBO) analysis.

=== Extension ===
More recent extensions, available in the CHARMM suite of codes, include the trans-influence (or trans effect) within VALBOND-TRANS and the possibility to run reactive molecular dynamics with "Multi-state VALBOND".
