= Period 1 element =

Element in first row of periodic table

A period 1 element is one of the chemical elements in the first row (or period) of the periodic table of the chemical elements. The periodic table is laid out in rows to illustrate periodic (recurring) trends in the chemical behaviour of the elements as their atomic number increases: a new row is begun when chemical behaviour begins to repeat, meaning that analog elements fall into the same vertical columns. The first period contains fewer elements than any other row in the table, with only two: hydrogen and helium. This situation can be explained by modern theories of atomic structure. In a quantum mechanical description of atomic structure, this period corresponds to the filling of the 1s orbital. Period 1 elements obey the duet rule in that they need two electrons to complete their valence shell.

Hydrogen and helium are the oldest and the most abundant elements in the universe.

== Periodic trends ==
All other periods in the periodic table contain at least eight elements, and it is often helpful to consider periodic trends across the period. However, period 1 contains only two elements, so this concept does not apply here.

In terms of vertical trends down groups, helium can be seen as a typical noble gas at the head of the IUPAC group 18, but as discussed below, hydrogen's chemistry is unique and it is not easily assigned to any group.

== Position of period 1 elements in the periodic table ==
The first electron shell, n = 1, consists of only one orbital, and the maximum number of valence electrons that a period 1 element can accommodate is two, both in the 1s orbital. The valence shell lacks "p" or any other kind of orbitals due to the general l < n constraint on the quantum numbers. Therefore, period 1 has exactly two elements. Although both hydrogen and helium are in the s-block, neither of them behaves similarly to other s-block elements. Their behaviour is so different from the other s-block elements that there is considerable disagreement over where these two elements should be placed in the periodic table.

Simply following electron configurations, hydrogen (electronic configuration 1s^{1}) and helium (1s^{2}) should be placed in groups 1 and 2, above lithium (1s^{2}2s^{1}) and beryllium (1s^{2}2s^{2}). While such a placement is common for hydrogen, it is rarely used for helium outside of the context of illustrating the electron configurations. Usually, hydrogen is placed in group 1, and helium in group 18: this is the placement found on the IUPAC periodic table. Some variation can be found on both these matters.

Like the group 1 metals, hydrogen has one electron in its outermost shell and typically loses its only electron in chemical reactions. It has some metal-like chemical properties, being able to displace some metals from their salts. But hydrogen forms a diatomic nonmetallic gas at standard conditions, unlike the alkali metals which are reactive solid metals. This and hydrogen's formation of hydrides, in which it gains an electron, brings it close to the properties of the halogens which do the same (though it is rarer for hydrogen to form H^{−} than H^{+}). Moreover, the lightest two halogens (fluorine and chlorine) are gaseous like hydrogen at standard conditions. Some properties of hydrogen are not a good fit for either group: hydrogen is neither highly oxidising nor highly reducing and is not reactive with water. Hydrogen thus has properties corresponding to both those of the alkali metals and the halogens, but matches neither group perfectly, and is thus difficult to place by its chemistry. Therefore, while the electronic placement of hydrogen in group 1 predominates, some rarer arrangements show either hydrogen in group 17, duplicate hydrogen in both groups 1 and 17, or float it separately from all groups. The possibility of "floating" hydrogen has nonetheless been criticised by Eric Scerri, who points out that removing it from all groups suggests that it is being excluded from the periodic law, when all elements should be subject to that law. A few authors have advocated more unusual placements for hydrogen, such as group 13 or group 14, on the grounds of trends in ionisation energy, electron affinity, and electronegativity.

Helium is an unreactive noble gas at standard conditions, and has a full outer shell: these properties are like the noble gases in group 18, but not at all like the reactive alkaline earth metals of group 2. Therefore, helium is nearly universally placed in group 18 which its properties best match. However, helium only has two outer electrons in its outer shell, whereas the other noble gases have eight; and it is an s-block element, whereas all other noble gases are p-block elements. Also, solid helium crystallises in a hexagonal close-packed structure, which matches beryllium and magnesium in group 2, but not the other noble gases in group 18. In these ways helium better matches the alkaline earth metals. Therefore, tables with both hydrogen and helium floating outside all groups may rarely be encountered.

A few chemists, such as Henry Bent, have advocated that the electronic placement in group 2 be adopted for helium. This assignment is also found in Charles Janet's left-step table. Arguments for this often rest on the first-row anomaly trend (s >> p > d > f), which states that the first element of each group often behaves quite differently from the succeeding ones: the difference is largest in the s-block (H and He), is moderate for the p-block (B to Ne), and is less pronounced for the d- and f-blocks. Thus helium as the first s^{2} element before the alkaline earth metals stands out as anomalous in a way that helium as the first noble gas does not. The normalized ionization potentials and electron affinities show better trends with helium in group 2 than in group 18; helium is expected to be slightly more reactive than neon (which breaks the general trend of reactivity in the noble gases, where the heavier ones are more reactive); and predicted helium compounds often lack neon analogues even theoretically, but sometimes have beryllium analogues.

== Elements ==
Chemical element			Block	Electron configuration
1	H	Hydrogen	s-block	1s^{1}
2	He	Helium	s-block	1s^{2}

=== Hydrogen ===
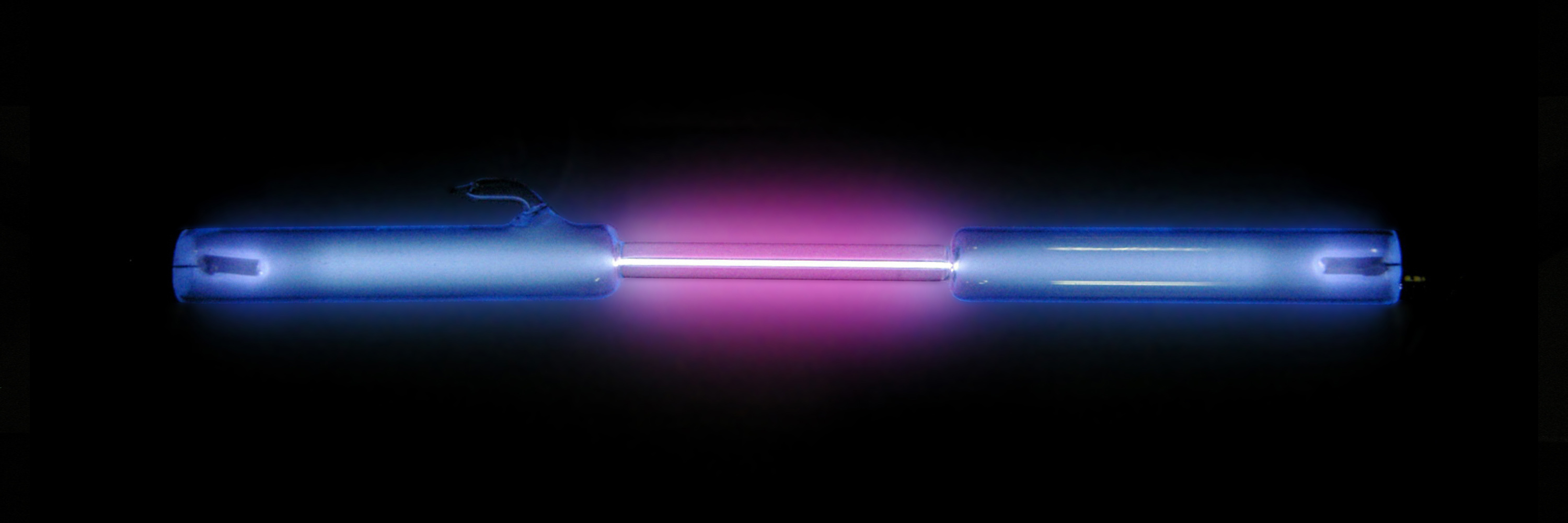
Hydrogen discharge tube

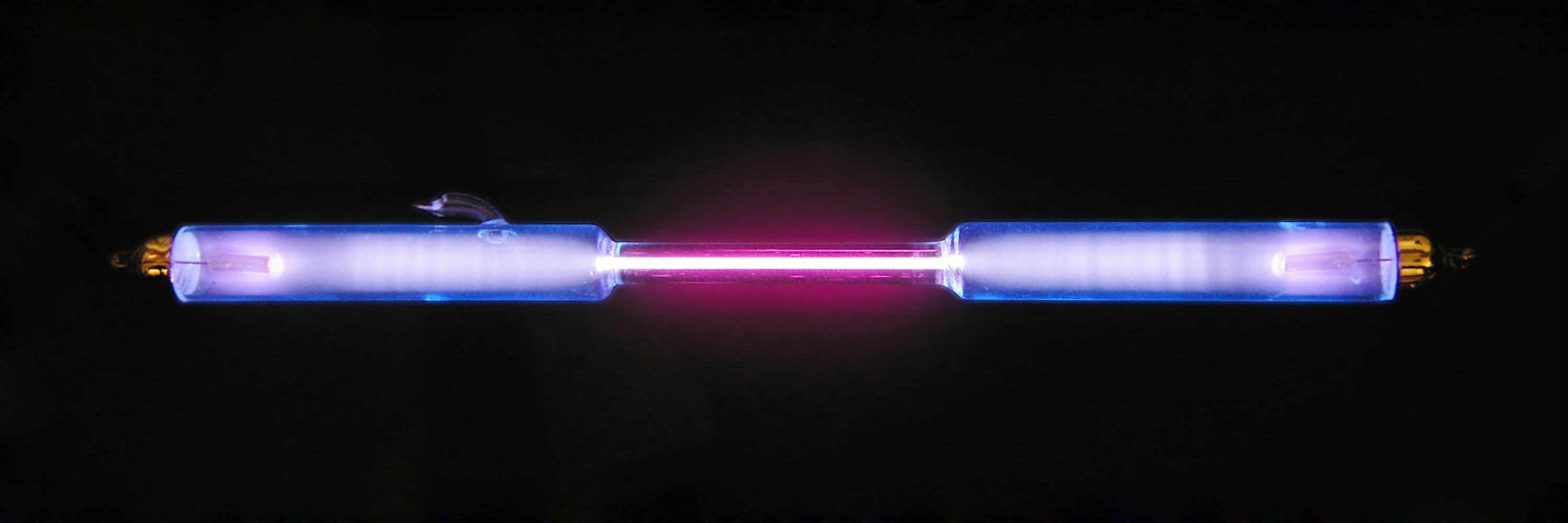
Deuterium discharge tube

Hydrogen (H) is the chemical element with atomic number 1. At standard temperature and pressure, hydrogen is a colorless, odorless, nonmetallic, tasteless, highly flammable diatomic gas with the molecular formula H_{2}. With an atomic mass of 1.00794 amu, hydrogen is the lightest element.

Hydrogen is the most abundant of the chemical elements, constituting roughly 75% of the universe's elemental mass. Stars in the main sequence are mainly composed of hydrogen in its plasma state. Elemental hydrogen is relatively rare on Earth, and is industrially produced from hydrocarbons such as methane, after which most elemental hydrogen is used "captively" (meaning locally at the production site), with the largest markets almost equally divided between fossil fuel upgrading, such as hydrocracking, and ammonia production, mostly for the fertilizer market. Hydrogen may be produced from water using the process of electrolysis, but this process is significantly more expensive commercially than hydrogen production from natural gas.

The most common naturally occurring isotope of hydrogen, known as protium, has a single proton and no neutrons. In ionic compounds, it can take on either a positive charge, becoming a cation composed of a bare proton, or a negative charge, becoming an anion known as a hydride. Hydrogen can form compounds with most elements and is present in water and most organic compounds. It plays a particularly important role in acid-base chemistry, in which many reactions involve the exchange of protons between soluble molecules. As the only neutral atom for which the Schrödinger equation can be solved analytically, study of the energetics and spectrum of the hydrogen atom has played a key role in the development of quantum mechanics.

The interactions of hydrogen with various metals are very important in metallurgy, as many metals can suffer hydrogen embrittlement, and in developing safe ways to store it for use as a fuel. Hydrogen is highly soluble in many compounds composed of rare earth metals and transition metals and can be dissolved in both crystalline and amorphous metals. Hydrogen solubility in metals is influenced by local distortions or impurities in the metal crystal lattice.

=== Helium ===
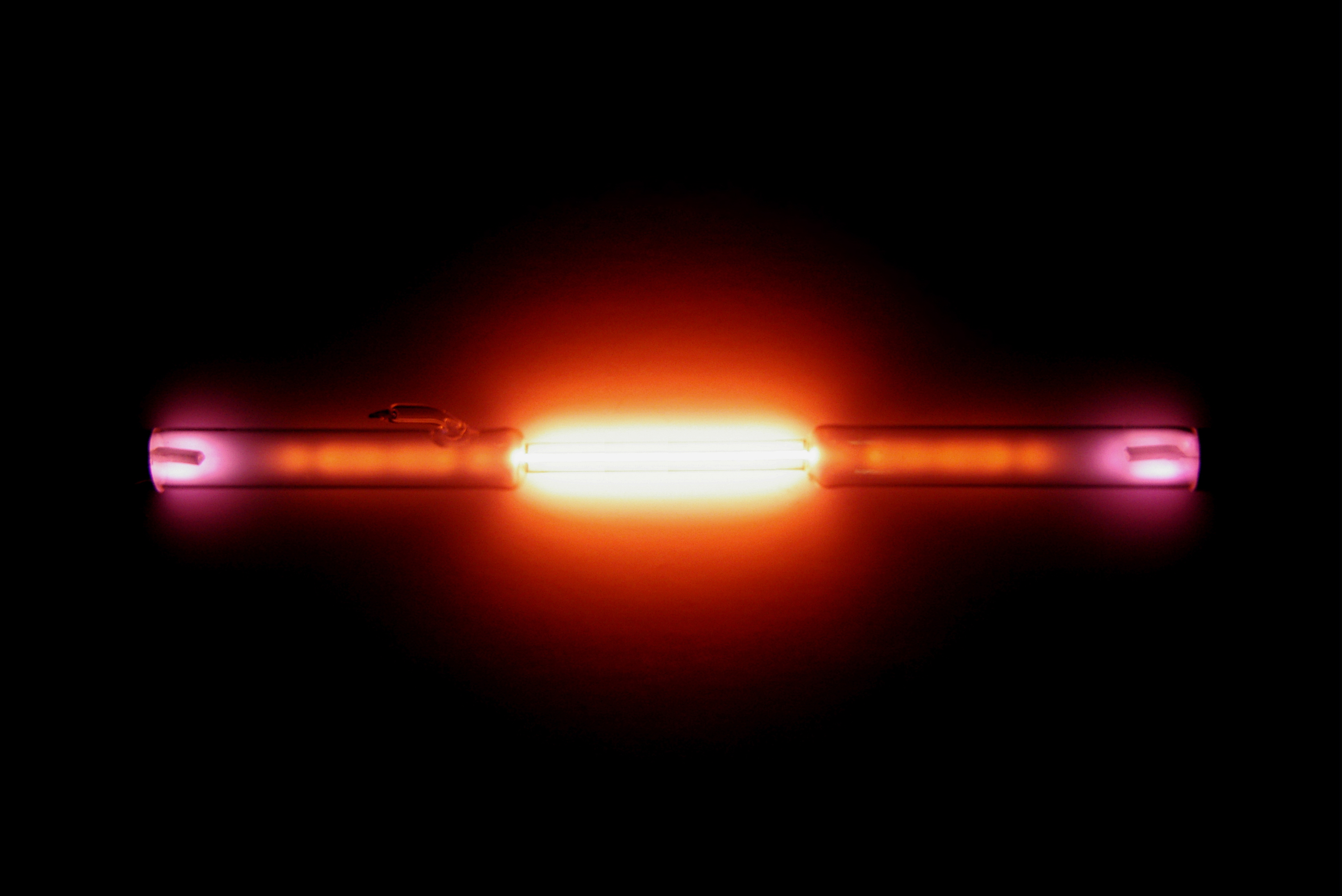
Helium discharge tube

Helium (He) is a colorless, odorless, tasteless, non-toxic, inert monatomic chemical element that heads the noble gas series in the periodic table and whose atomic number is 2. Its boiling and melting points are the lowest among the elements and it exists only as a gas except in extreme conditions.

Helium was discovered in 1868 by French astronomer Pierre Janssen, who first detected the substance as an unknown yellow spectral line signature in light from a solar eclipse. In 1903, large reserves of helium were found in the natural gas fields of the United States, which is by far the largest supplier of the gas. The substance is used in cryogenics, in deep-sea breathing systems, to cool superconducting magnets, in helium dating, for inflating balloons, for providing lift in airships, and as a protective gas for industrial uses such as arc welding and growing silicon wafers. Inhaling a small volume of the gas temporarily changes the timbre and quality of the human voice. The behavior of liquid helium-4's two fluid phases, helium I and helium II, is important to researchers studying quantum mechanics and the phenomenon of superfluidity in particular, and to those looking at the effects that temperatures near absolute zero have on matter, such as with superconductivity.

Helium is the second lightest element and is the second most abundant in the observable universe. Most helium was formed during the Big Bang, but new helium is being created as a result of the nuclear fusion of hydrogen in stars. On Earth, helium is relatively rare and is created by the natural decay of some radioactive elements because the alpha particles that are emitted consist of helium nuclei. This radiogenic helium is trapped with natural gas in concentrations of up to seven percent by volume, from which it is extracted commercially by a low-temperature separation process called fractional distillation.
