= Bent bond (disambiguation) =

The term bent bond generally refers to any form of bond in a structure that resembles the shape of a banana, but may also refer to:

- Bent molecular geometry in VSEPR Theory and molecular geometry, a structure which contains one or two lone pairs.
- Rarely, in Thermodynamics, as the application of heat to a system contributing towards the breaking of bonds.
