= Developmental bioelectricity =

Electric current produced in living cells

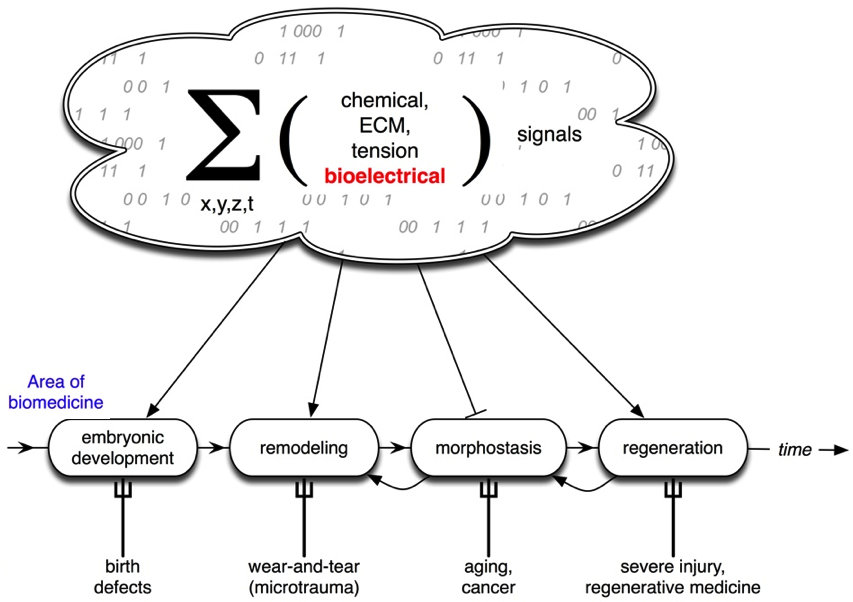
The morphogenetic field of pattern formation and maintenance during an organism's lifespan

In biology, developmental bioelectricity is the regulation of cell, tissue, and organ-level patterning and behavior by electrical signals during the development of embryonic animals and plants. The charge carrier in developmental bioelectricity is the ion (a charged atom) rather than the electron, and an electric current and field are generated whenever a net ion flux occurs. Cells and tissues of all types use flows of ions to communicate electrically. Endogenous electric currents and fields, ion fluxes, and differences in resting potential across tissues comprise a signalling system. It functions along with biochemical factors, transcriptional networks, and other physical forces to regulate cell behaviour and large-scale patterning in processes such as embryogenesis, regeneration, and cancer suppression.

== Overview ==
Developmental bioelectricity is a sub-discipline of biology, related to, but distinct from, neurophysiology and bioelectromagnetics. Developmental bioelectricity refers to the endogenous ion fluxes, transmembrane and transepithelial voltage gradients, and electric currents and fields produced and sustained in living cells and tissues. This electrical activity is often used during embryogenesis, regeneration, and cancer suppression—it is one layer of the complex field of signals that impinge upon all cells in vivo and regulate their interactions during pattern formation and maintenance. This is distinct from neural bioelectricity (classically termed electrophysiology), which refers to the rapid and transient spiking in well-recognized excitable cells like neurons and myocytes (muscle cells); and from bioelectromagnetics, which refers to the effects of applied electromagnetic radiation, and endogenous electromagnetics such as biophoton emission and magnetite.

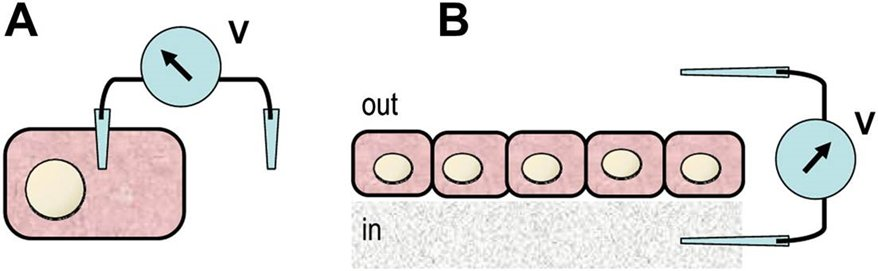
Membrane potential and transepithelial potential.

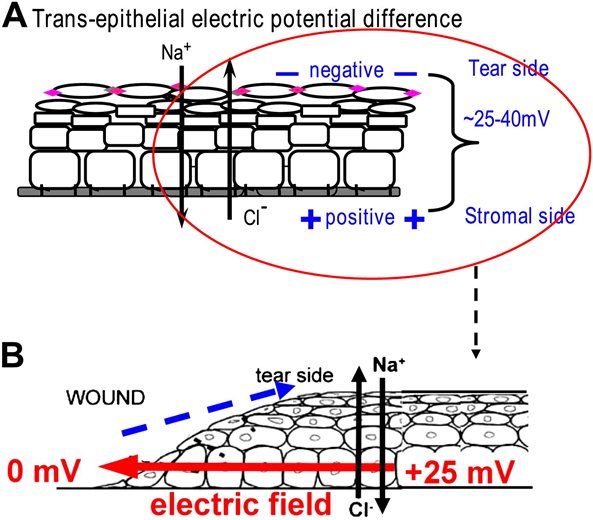
Electric potential difference across corneal epithelium, and the generation of wound electric fields.

Optically estimated bioelectric patterns using fluorescent lifetime imaging of bioelectric dyes of embryonic frog face (left), embryonic frog skin (center) and cultured frog neural crest explants (right).

The inside/outside discontinuity at the cell surface enabled by a lipid bilayer membrane (capacitor) is at the core of bioelectricity. The plasma membrane was an indispensable structure for the origin and evolution of life itself. It provided compartmentalization permitting the setting of a differential voltage/potential gradient (battery or voltage source) across the membrane, probably allowing early and rudimentary bioenergetics that fueled cell mechanisms. During evolution, the initially purely passive diffusion of ions (charge carriers), became gradually controlled by the acquisition of ion channels, pumps, exchangers, and transporters. These energetically free (resistors or conductors, passive transport) or expensive (current sources, active transport) translocators set and fine tune voltage gradients – resting potentials – that are ubiquitous and essential to life's physiology, ranging from bioenergetics, motion, sensing, nutrient transport, toxins clearance, and signaling in homeostatic and disease/injury conditions. In response to stimuli or barrier disruption (short-circuit) of the membrane, ions powered by the voltage gradient (electromotive force) diffuse or leak, respectively, through the cytoplasm and interstitial fluids (conductors), generating measurable electric currents – net ion fluxes – and fields. Some ions (such as calcium) and molecules (such as hydrogen peroxide) modulate targeted translocators to produce a current or to enhance, mitigate or even reverse an initial current, being switchers.

Endogenous bioelectric signals are produced in cells by the cumulative action of ion channels, pumps, and transporters. In non-excitable cells, the resting potential across the plasma membrane (Vmem) of individual cells propagate across distances via electrical synapses known as gap junctions (conductors), which allow cells to share their resting potential with neighbors. Aligned and stacked cells (such as in epithelia) generate transepithelial potentials (such as batteries in series) and electric fields, which likewise propagate across tissues. Tight junctions (resistors) efficiently mitigate the paracellular ion diffusion and leakage, precluding the voltage short circuit. Together, these voltages and electric fields form rich and dynamic patterns inside living bodies that demarcate anatomical features, thus acting like blueprints for gene expression and morphogenesis in some instances. More than correlations, these bioelectrical distributions are dynamic, evolving with time and with the microenvironment and even long-distant conditions to serve as instructive influences over cell behavior and large-scale patterning during embryogenesis, regeneration, and cancer suppression. Bioelectric control mechanisms are an important emerging target for advances in regenerative medicine, birth defects, cancer, and synthetic bioengineering.

== History ==
=== 18th century ===
Developmental bioelectricity began in the 18th century. Several seminal works stimulating muscle contractions using Leyden jars culminated with the publication of classical studies by Luigi Galvani in 1791 (De viribus electricitatis in motu musculari) and 1794. In these, Galvani thought to have uncovered intrinsic electric-producing ability in living tissues or "animal electricity". Alessandro Volta showed that the frog's leg muscle twitching was due to a static electricity generator and from dissimilar metals undergoing or catalyzing electrochemical reactions. Galvani showed, in a 1794 study, twitching without metal electricity by touching the leg muscle with a deviating cut sciatic nerve, definitively demonstrating "animal electricity". Unknowingly, Galvani with this and related experiments discovered the injury current (ion leakage driven by the intact membrane/epithelial potential) and injury potential (potential difference between injured and intact membrane/epithelium). The injury potential was, in fact, the electrical source behind the leg contraction, as realized in the next century. Subsequent work ultimately extended this field broadly beyond nerve and muscle to all cells, from bacteria to non-excitable mammalian cells.

=== 19th century ===
Building on earlier studies, further glimpses of developmental bioelectricity occurred with the discovery of wound-related electric currents and fields in the 1840s, when the electrophysiologist Emil du Bois-Reymond reported macroscopic level electrical activities in frog, fish and human bodies. He recorded minute electric currents in live tissues and organisms with a then state-of-the-art galvanometer made of insulated copper wire coils. He unveiled the fast-changing electricity associated with muscle contraction and nerve excitation – the action potentials. Du Bois-Reymond also reported in detail less fluctuating electricity at wounds – injury current and potential – he made to himself.

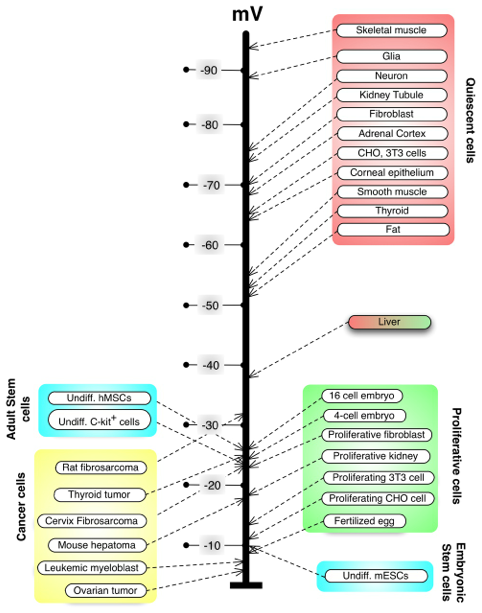
Some sample cell types and their resting potentials, revealing that actively proliferating and plastic cells cluster in the depolarized end of the continuum, while terminally-differentiated mature cell types tend to be strongly polarized.

=== Early 20th century ===
Developmental bioelectricity work began in earnest at the beginning of the 20th century. Ida H. Hyde studied the role of electricity in the development of eggs. T. H. Morgan and others studied the electrophysiology of the earthworm. Oren E. Frazee studied the effects of electricity on limb regeneration in amphibians. E. J. Lund explored morphogenesis in flowering plants. Libbie Hyman studied vertebrate and invertebrate animals.

In the 1920s and 1930s, Elmer J. Lund and Harold Saxton Burr wrote multiple papers about the role of electricity in embryonic development. Lund measured currents in a large number of living model systems, correlating them to changes in patterning. In contrast, Burr used a voltmeter to measure voltage gradients, examining developing embryonic tissues and tumors, in a range of animals and plants. Applied electric fields were demonstrated to alter the regeneration of planarian by Marsh and Beams in the 1940s and 1950s, inducing the formation of heads or tails at cut sites, reversing the primary body polarity.

=== Late 20th century ===
In the 1970s, Lionel Jaffe and Richard Nuccittelli's introduction and development of the vibrating probe, the first device for quantitative non-invasive characterization of the extracellular minute ion currents, revitalized the field.

Researchers such as Joseph Vanable, Richard Borgens, Ken Robinson, and Colin McCaig explored the roles of endogenous bioelectric signaling in limb development and regeneration, embryogenesis, organ polarity, and wound healing.

C.D. Cone studied the role of resting potential in regulating cell differentiation and proliferation. Subsequent work has identified specific regions of the resting potential spectrum that correspond to distinct cell states such as quiescent, stem, cancer, and terminally differentiated.

Although this body of work generated a significant amount of high-quality physiological data, this large-scale biophysics approach has historically come second to the study of biochemical gradients and genetic networks in biology education, funding, and overall popularity among biologists. A key factor that contributed to this field lagging behind molecular genetics and biochemistry is that bioelectricity is inherently a living phenomenon – it cannot be studied in fixed specimens. Working with bioelectricity is more complex than traditional approaches to developmental biology, both methodologically and conceptually, as it typically requires a highly interdisciplinary approach.

=== Biological battery ===
A “biological battery” was demonstrated in late 2025 at Belmonte Arboretum, part of Wageningen University & Research as part of its program provides educational scientific experiences to young people. In this case a path was marked by small Light-emitting diodes (LEDs) that provide a diffuse night-time glow sufficient to mark the path without disturbing nature.

The electricity used to power the LEDs is essentially sunlight that fell on green photosynthesising living plant material. That process takes water from the ground (H2O) and carbon dioxide (CO2) in the air to rearrange the hydrogen and oxygen into carbohydrate molecules, releasing unwanted oxygen to the air.

Only some of the solar energy collected by the green material is used for photosynthesis, some is discharged through the roots into the soil, where bacteria use it to synthesize other essential molecules and elements such as nitrogen that support plant life.

To extract electricity from sunlight, conductive carbon electrodes were introduced near the roots of bushes to capture the “free” electrons produced by bacteria. These serve as the negative cell terminals, other carbon electrodes placed in the air provided the corresponding positive connections. Although the energy captured from a single bush is very small many can be connected in series (a “battery” of "cells") to provide enough to drive the LEDs without conventional electrochemical cells or regular solar cells.

== Study techniques ==
=== Electrodes ===
The gold standard techniques to quantitatively extract electric dimensions from living specimens, ranging from cell to organism levels, are the glass microelectrode (or micropipette), the vibrating (or self-referencing) voltage probe, and the vibrating ion-selective microelectrode. The former is inherently invasive, and the two latter are non-invasive, but all are ultra-sensitive and fast-responsive sensors extensively used in a plethora of physiological conditions in widespread biological models.

The glass microelectrode was developed in the 1940s to study the action potential of excitable cells, deriving from the seminal work by Hodgkin and Huxley in the giant axon squid. It is simply a liquid salt bridge connecting the biological specimen with the electrode, protecting tissues from leachable toxins and redox reactions of the bare electrode. Owing to its low impedance, low junction potential and weak polarization, silver electrodes are standard transducers of the ionic into electric current that occurs through a reversible redox reaction at the electrode surface.

The vibrating probe was introduced in biological studies in the 1970s. The voltage-sensitive probe is electroplated with platinum to form a capacitive black tip ball with large surface area. When vibrating in an artificial or natural DC voltage gradient, the capacitive ball oscillates in a sinusoidal AC output. The amplitude of the wave is proportional to the measuring potential difference at the frequency of the vibration, efficiently filtered by a lock-in amplifier that boosts probe's sensitivity.

The vibrating ion-selective microelectrode was first used in 1990 to measure calcium fluxes in various cells and tissues. The ion-selective microelectrode is an adaptation of the glass microelectrode, where an ion-specific liquid ion exchanger (ionophore) is tip-filled into a previously silanized (to prevent leakage) microelectrode. Also, the microelectrode vibrates at low frequencies to operate in the accurate self-referencing mode. Only the specific ion permeates the ionophore, therefore the voltage readout is proportional to the ion concentration in the measuring condition. Then, flux is calculated using the Fick's first law.

Emerging optic-based techniques, for example, the pH optrode (or optode), which can be integrated into a self-referencing system may become an alternative or additional technique in bioelectricity laboratories. The optrode does not require referencing and is insensitive to electromagnetism simplifying system setting up and making it a suitable option for recordings where electric stimulation is simultaneously applied.

Much work to functionally study bioelectric signaling has made use of applied (exogenous) electric currents and fields via DC and AC voltage-delivering apparatus integrated with agarose salt bridges. These devices can generate countless combinations of voltage magnitude and direction, pulses, and frequencies. Currently, lab-on-a-chip mediated application of electric fields is gaining ground in the field with the possibility to allow high-throughput screening assays of the large combinatory outputs.

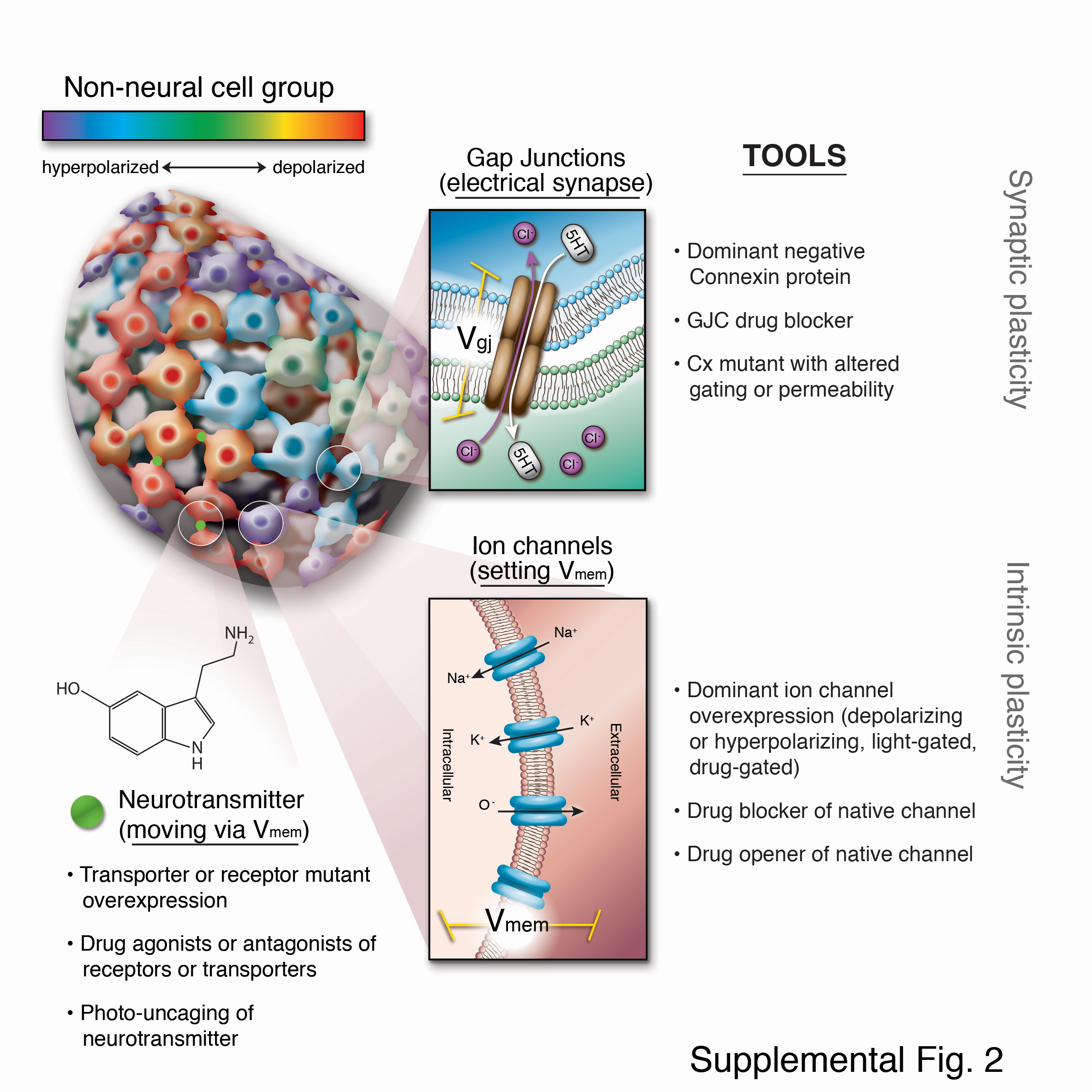
Tools for manipulating non-neural bioelectricity include pharmacological and genetic reagents to alter cell connectivity (control gap junctions), cell V_{mem} (control ion channels/pumps), and bioelectrically guided 2nd messengers (control neurotransmitters and other small molecules).

=== Fluorescence ===
Progress in molecular biology over the last six decades has produced powerful tools that facilitate the dissection of biochemical and genetic signals; yet, they tend to not be well-suited for bioelectric studies in vivo. Prior work relied extensively on current applied directly by electrodes, reinvigorated by significant recent advances in materials science and extracellular current measurements, facilitated by sophisticated self-referencing electrode systems. While electrode applications for manipulating neuraly-controlled body processes have recently attracted much attention, there are other opportunities for controlling somatic processes, as most cell types are electrically active and respond to ionic signals from themselves and their neighbors.

In the early part of the 21st century, a number of new molecular techniques were developed that allowed bioelectric pathways to be investigated with a high degree of mechanistic resolution, and to be linked to canonical molecular cascades. These include:

1. Pharmacological screens to identify endogenous channels and pumps responsible for specific patterning events;
2. Voltage-sensitive fluorescent reporter dyes and genetically encoded fluorescent voltage indicators for the characterization of the bioelectric state in vivo.
3. Panels of well-characterized dominant ion channels that can be misexpressed in cells of interest to alter the bioelectric state in desired ways; and
4. Computational platforms that are coming on-line to assist in building predictive models of bioelectric dynamics in tissues.

Compared with the electrode-based techniques, the molecular probes provide a wider spatial resolution and facilitated dynamic analysis over time. Although calibration or titration can be possible, molecular probes are typically semi-quantitative, whereas electrodes provide absolute bioelectric values. Another advantage of fluorescence and other probes is their less-invasive nature and spatial multiplexing, enabling the simultaneous monitoring of large areas of embryonic or other tissues in vivo during normal or pathological pattering processes.

== Roles in organisms ==
=== Early development ===
Work in model systems such as Xenopus laevis and zebrafish has revealed a role for bioelectric signaling in the development of heart, face, eye, brain, and other organs. Screens have identified roles for ion channels in size control of structures such as the zebrafish fin, while focused gain-of-function studies have shown for example that body parts can be re-specified at the organ level – for example creating entire eyes in gut endoderm. As in the brain, developmental bioelectrics can integrate information across significant distance in the embryo, for example such as the control of brain size by bioelectric states of ventral tissue. and the control of tumorigenesis at the site of oncogene expression by bioelectric state of remote cells.

Human disorders, as well as numerous mouse mutants show that bioelectric signaling is important for human development (tables 1 and 2). Those effects are pervasively linked to channelopathies, which are human disorders that result from mutations that disrupt ion channels.

Several channelopathies result in morphological abnormalities or congenital birth defects in addition to symptoms that affect muscle and or neurons. For example, mutations that disrupt an inwardly rectifying potassium channel Kir2.1 cause dominantly inherited Andersen–Tawil syndrome (ATS). ATS patients experience periodic paralysis, cardiac arrhythmias, and multiple morphological abnormalities that can include cleft or high arched palate, cleft or thin upper lip, flattened philtrum, micrognathia, dental oligodontia, enamel hypoplasia, delayed dentition eruption, malocclusion, broad forehead, wide set eyes, low set ears, syndactyly, clinodactyly, brachydactyly, and dysplastic kidneys. Mutations that disrupt another inwardly rectifying K^{+} channel Girk2 encoded by KCNJ6 cause Keppen-Lubinsky syndrome which includes microcephaly, a narrow nasal bridge, a high arched palate, and severe generalized lipodystrophy (failure to generate adipose tissue). KCNJ6 is in the Down syndrome critical region such that duplications that include this region lead to craniofacial and limb abnormalities and duplications that do not include this region do not lead to morphological symptoms of Down syndrome. Mutations in KCNH1, a voltage gated potassium channel lead to Temple-Baraitser (also known as Zimmermann- Laband) syndrome. Common features of Temple-Baraitser syndrome include absent or hypoplastic of finger and toe nails and phalanges and joint instability. Craniofacial defects associated with mutations in KCNH1 include cleft or high arched palate, hypertelorism, dysmorphic ears, dysmorphic nose, gingival hypertrophy, and abnormal number of teeth.

Mutations in CaV1.2, a voltage gated Ca^{2+} channel, lead to Timothy syndrome, which causes severe cardiac arrhythmia (long-QT) along with syndactyly and similar craniofacial defects to Andersen-Tawil syndrome including cleft or high-arched palate, micrognathia, low set ears, syndactyly and brachydactyly. While these channelopathies are rare, they show that functional ion channels are important for development. Furthermore, in utero exposure to anti-epileptic medications that target some ion channels also cause increased incidence of birth defects such as oral cleft. The effects of both genetic and exogenous disruption of ion channels lend insight into the importance of bioelectric signaling in development.

=== Wound healing and cell guidance ===
One of the best-understood roles for bioelectric gradients is at the tissue-level endogenous electric fields utilized during wound healing. It is challenging to study wound-associated electric fields, because these fields are weak, less fluctuating, and do not have immediate biological responses when compared to nerve pulses and muscle contraction. The development of the vibrating and glass microelectrodes, demonstrated that wounds indeed produced and, importantly, sustained measurable electric currents and electric fields. These techniques allow further characterization of the wound electric fields/currents at cornea and skin wounds, which show active spatial and temporal features, suggesting active regulation of these electrical phenomena. For example, the wound electric currents are always the strongest at the wound edge, which gradually increased to reach a peak about 1 hour after injury. At wounds in diabetic animals, the wound electric fields are significantly compromised. Understanding the mechanisms of generation and regulation of the wound electric currents/fields is expected to reveal new approaches to manipulate the electrical aspect for better wound healing.

How are the electric fields at a wound produced? Epithelia actively pump and differentially segregate ions. In the cornea epithelium, for example, Na^{+} and K^{+} are transported inwards from tear fluid to extracellular fluid, and Cl^{−} is transported out of the extracellular fluid into the tear fluid. The epithelial cells are connected by tight junctions, forming the major electrical resistive barrier, and thus establishing an electrical gradient across the epithelium – the transepithelial potential (TEP). Breaking the epithelial barrier, as occurs in any wounds, creates a hole that breaches the high electrical resistance established by the tight junctions in the epithelial sheet, short-circuiting the epithelium locally. The TEP therefore drops to zero at the wound. However, normal ion transport continues in unwounded epithelial cells beyond the wound edge (typically <1 mm away), driving positive charge flow out of the wound and establishing a steady, laterally-oriented electric field (EF) with the cathode at the wound. Skin also generates a TEP, and when a skin wound is made, similar wound electric currents and fields arise, until the epithelial barrier function recovers to terminate the short-circuit at the wound. When wound electric fields are manipulated with pharmacological agents that either stimulate or inhibit transport of ions, the wound electric fields also increase or decrease, respectively. Wound healing can be speed up or slowed down accordingly in cornea wounds.

How do electric fields affect wound healing? To heal wounds, cells surrounding the wound must migrate and grow directionally into the wound to cover the defect and restore the barrier. Cells important to heal wounds respond remarkably well to applied electric fields of the same strength that are measured at wounds. The whole gamut of cell types and their responses following injury are affected by physiological electric fields. Those include migration and division of epithelial cells, sprouting and extension of nerves, and migration of leukocytes and endothelial cells. The most well studied cellular behavior is directional migration of epithelial cells in electric fields – electrotaxis. The epithelial cells migrate directionally to the negative pole (cathode), which at a wound is the field polarity of the endogenous vectorial electric fields in the epithelium, pointing (positive to negative) to the wound center. Epithelial cells of the cornea, keratinocytes from the skin, and many other types of cells show directional migration at electric field strengths as low as a few mV mm^{−1}. Large sheets of monolayer epithelial cells, and sheets of stratified multilayered epithelial cells also migrate directionally. Such collective movement closely resembles what happens during wound healing in vivo, where cell sheets move collectively into the wound bed to cover the wound and restore the barrier function of the skin or cornea.

How cells sense such minute extracellular electric fields remains largely elusive. Recent research has started to identify some genetic, signaling and structural elements underlying how cells sense and respond to small physiological electric fields. These include ion channels, intracellular signaling pathways, membrane lipid rafts, and electrophoresis of cellular membrane components.

=== Limb regeneration in animals ===
In the early 20th century, Albert Mathews seminally correlated regeneration of a cnidarian polyp with the potential difference between polyp and stolon surfaces, and affected regeneration by imposing countercurrents. Amedeo Herlitzka, following on the wound electric currents footsteps of his mentor, du Bois-Raymond, theorized about electric currents playing an early role in regeneration, maybe initiating cell proliferation. Using electric fields overriding endogenous ones, Marsh and Beams astoundingly generated double-headed planarians and even reversed the primary body polarity entirely, with tails growing where a head previously existed. After these seed studies, variations of the idea that bioelectricity could sense injury and trigger or at least be a major player in regeneration have spurred over the decades until the present day. A potential explanation lies on resting potentials (primarily Vmem and TEP), which can be, at least in part, dormant sensors (alarms) ready to detect and effectors (triggers) ready to react to local damage.

Following up on the relative success of electric stimulation on non-permissive frog leg regeneration using an implanted bimetallic rod in the late 1960s, the bioelectric extracellular aspect of amphibian limb regeneration was extensively dissected in the next decades. Definitive descriptive and functional physiological data was made possible owing to the development of the ultra-sensitive vibrating probe and improved application devices. Amputation invariably leads to a skin-driven outward current and a consequent lateral electric field setting the cathode at the wound site. Although initially pure ion leakage, an active component eventually takes place and blocking ion translocators typically impairs regeneration. Using biomimetic exogenous electric currents and fields, partial regeneration was achieved, which typically included tissue growth and increased neuronal tissue. Conversely, precluding or reverting endogenous electric current and fields impairs regeneration. These studies in amphibian limb regeneration and related studies in lampreys and mammals combined with those of bone fracture healing and in vitro studies, led to the general rule that migrating (such as keratinocytes, leucocytes and endothelial cells) and outgrowing (such as axons) cells contributing to regeneration undergo electrotaxis towards the cathode (injury original site). Congruently, an anode is associated with tissue resorption or degeneration, as occurs in impaired regeneration and osteoclastic resorption in bone. Despite these efforts, the promise for a significant epimorphic regeneration in mammals remains a major frontier for future efforts, which includes the use of wearable bioreactors to provide an environment within which pro-regenerative bioelectric states can be driven and continued efforts at electrical stimulation.

Recent molecular work has identified proton and sodium flux as being important for tail regeneration in Xenopus tadpoles, and shown that regeneration of the entire tail (with spinal cord, muscle, etc.) could be triggered in a range of normally non-regenerative conditions by either molecular-genetic, pharmacological, or optogenetic methods. In planaria, work on bioelectric mechanism has revealed control of stem cell behavior, size control during remodeling, anterior-posterior polarity, and head shape. Gap junction-mediated alteration of physiological signaling produces two-headed worms in Dugesia japonica; remarkably, these animals continue to regenerate as two-headed in future rounds of regeneration months after the gap junction-blocking reagent has left the tissue. This stable, long-term alteration of the anatomical layout to which animals regenerate, without genomic editing, is an example of epigenetic inheritance of body pattern, and is also the only available "strain" of planarian species exhibiting an inherited anatomical change that is different from the wild-type.

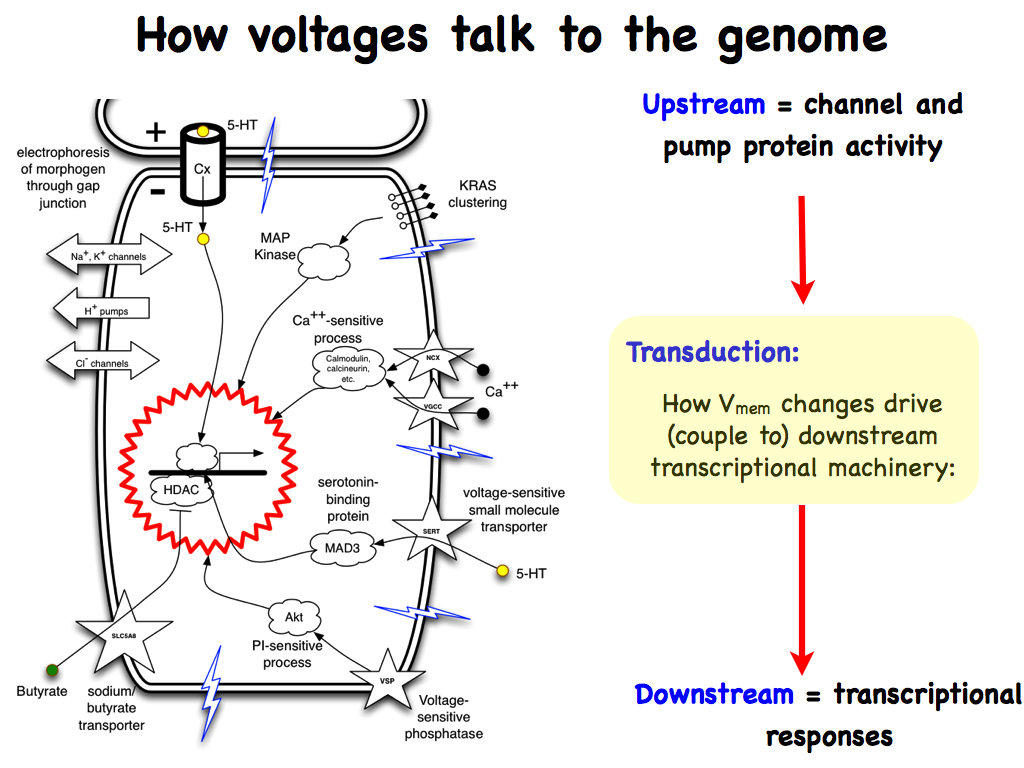
Voltage changes can be transduced to downstream effector mechanisms via a variety of 2nd messenger processes, including Vmem-dependent movement of small signaling molecules like serotonin through transporters or gap junctions, voltage-sensitive phosphatases, voltage-gated calcium channels (which trigger calcium-signaling cascades), and dimerization of receptors in the cell surface.

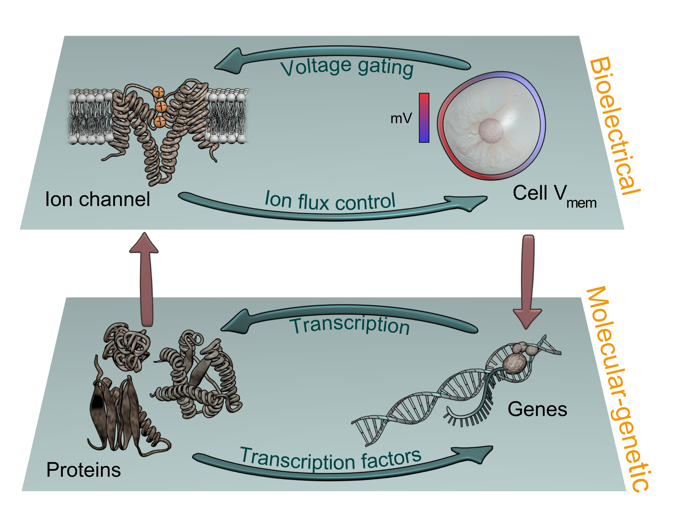
Bioelectricity and genetic expression work together in an integrated fashion; nothing is downstream.

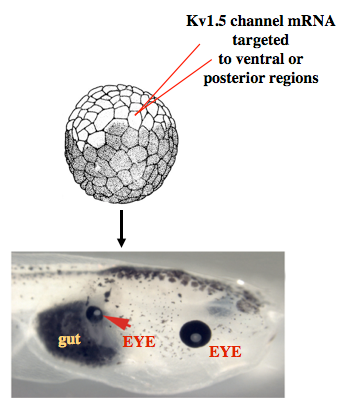
Misexpression of specific ion channels in diverse areas of frog embryos can induce the creation of ectopic organs, such as eyes on gut tissue.

=== Cancer ===
Defection of cells from the normally tight coordination of activity towards an anatomical structure results in cancer; it is thus no surprise that bioelectricity – a key mechanism for coordinating cell growth and patterning – is a target often implicated in cancer and metastasis. Indeed, it has long been known that gap junctions have a key role in carcinogenesis and progression. Channels can behave as oncogenes and are thus suitable as novel drug targets. Recent work in amphibian models has shown that depolarization of resting potential can trigger metastatic behavior in normal cells, while hyperpolarization (induced by ion channel misexpression, drugs, or light) can suppress tumorigenesis induced by expression of human oncogenes. Depolarization of resting potential appears to be a bioelectric signature by which incipient tumor sites can be detected non-invasively. Refinement of the bioelectric signature of cancer in biomedical contexts, as a diagnostic modality, is one of the possible applications of this field. Excitingly, the ambivalence of polarity – depolarization as marker and hyperpolarization as treatment – make it conceptually possible to derive theragnostic (portmanteau of therapeutics with diagnostics) approaches, designed to simultaneously detect and treat early tumors, in this case based on the normalization of the membrane polarization.

=== Pattern regulation ===
Recent experiments using ion channel opener/blocker drugs, as well as dominant ion channel misexpression, in a range of model species, has shown that bioelectricity, specifically, voltage gradients instruct not only stem cell behavior but also large-scale patterning. Patterning cues are often mediated by spatial gradients of cell resting potentials, or Vmem, which can be transduced into second messenger cascades and transcriptional changes by a handful of known mechanisms. These potentials are set by the function of ion channels and pumps, and shaped by gap junctional connections which establish developmental compartments (isopotential cell fields). Because both gap junctions and ion channels are themselves voltage-sensitive, cell groups implement electric circuits with rich feedback capabilities. The outputs of developmental bioelectric dynamics in vivo represent large-scale patterning decisions such as the number of heads in planarian, the shape of the face in frog development, and the size of tails in zebrafish. Experimental modulation of endogenous bioelectric prepatterns have enabled converting body regions (such as the gut) to a complete eye, inducing regeneration of appendages such as tadpole tails at non-regenerative contexts, and conversion of flatworm head shapes and contents to patterns appropriate to other species of flatworms, despite a normal genome. Recent work has shown the use of physiological modeling environments for identifying predictive interventions to target bioelectric states for repair of embryonic brain defects under a range of genetic and pharmacologically induced teratologies.

== Future research ==
Research in this field is progressing along several frontiers. First is the reductive program of understanding how bioelectric signals are produced, how voltage changes in the cell membrane are able to regulate cell behavior, and what the genetic and epigenetic downstream targets of bioelectric signals are. A few mechanisms that transduce bioelectric change into alterations of gene expression are already known, including the bioelectric control of movement of small second-messenger molecules through cells, including serotonin and butyrate, voltage sensitive phosphatases, among others. Also known are numerous gene targets of voltage signaling, such as Notch, BMP, FGF, and HIF-1α. Thus, the proximal mechanisms of bioelectric signaling within single cells are becoming well-understood, and advances in optogenetics and magnetogenetics continue to facilitate this research program. More challenging however is the integrative program of understanding how specific patterns of bioelectric dynamics help control the algorithms that accomplish large-scale pattern regulation (regeneration and development of complex anatomy). The incorporation of bioelectrics with chemical signaling in the emerging field of probing cell sensory perception and decision-making is an important frontier for future work.

Bioelectric modulation has shown control over complex morphogenesis and remodeling, not merely setting individual cell identity. Moreover, a number of the key results in this field have shown that bioelectric circuits are non-local – regions of the body make decisions based on bioelectric events at a considerable distance. Such non-cell-autonomous events suggest distributed network models of bioelectric control; new computational and conceptual paradigms may need to be developed to understand spatial information processing in bioelectrically active tissues. It has been suggested that results from the fields of primitive cognition and unconventional computation are relevant to the program of cracking the bioelectric code. Finally, efforts in biomedicine and bioengineering are developing applications such as wearable bioreactors for delivering voltage-modifying reagents to wound sites, and ion channel-modifying drugs (a kind of electroceutical) for repair of birth defects and regenerative repair. Synthetic biologists are likewise starting to incorporate bioelectric circuits into hybrid constructs.

Table 1: ion channels and pumps implicated in patterning
Protein	Morphogenetic role or LOF (loss of function) phenotype	Species	Reference
TRH1 K^{+} transporter	Root hair patterning	Arabidopsis	
Kir2.1potassium channel	Wing patterning	Drosophila	
Kir7.1 K^{+} channel	Craniofacial patterning, lung development	Mus musculus	
NHE2 Na^{+}/H^{+} exchanger	Epithelial patterning	Drosophila	
V-ATPase proton pump	Wing hair patterning, Pigmentation and brain patterning, Craniofacial patterning	Drosophila, Oryzias latipes, Homo sapiens	
HCN1, Kv3.1 K^{+} channels	Forebrain patterning	Mus musculus	
KCNC1 K^{+} channel	Growth deficits	Mus musculus	
TWIK-1 K^{+} channel (KCNK1)	Cardiac (atrial) size	Mus musculus	
KCNJ6 K^{+}channel	Keppen-Lubinsky syndrome – craniofacial and brain	Homo sapiens	
KCNH1 (hEAG1) K^{+} channel and ATP6V1B2 V-ATPase proton pump	Zimmermman-Laband and Temple-Baraitser syndrome – craniofacial and brain defects, dysplasia/aplasia of nails of thumb and great toe.	Homo sapiens	
GLRa4 chloride channel	Craniofacial anomalies	Homo sapiens	
KCNJ8 K^{+}	Cantu syndrome – face, heart, skeleton, brain defects	Homo sapiens	
NALCN (Na^{+} leak channel)	Freeman-Sheldon syndrome – limbs, face, brain	Homo sapiens	
CFTR chloride channel	Bilateral absence of vas deferens	Homo sapiens	
KCNC1	Head/face dysmorphias	Homo sapiens	
KCNK9, TASK3 K^{+} channels	Birk-Barel syndrome – craniofacial defects, brain (cortical patterning) defects	Homo sapiens	
Kir6.2 K^{+} channel	Craniofacial defects	Homo sapiens	
KCNQ1 K^{+} channel (via epigenetic regulation)	Hypertrophy of tongue, liver, spleen, pancreas, kidneys, adrenals, genitalia – Beckwith-Wiedemann syndrome; craniofacial and limb defects, early development	Homo sapiens, Mus musculus, Drosophila	
KCNQ1 K^{+} channel	Jervell and Lange-Nielsen syndrome - inner ear and limb	Homo sapiens, Mus musculus	
Kir2.1 K^{+} channel (KNCJ2)	Andersen-Tawil syndrome – craniofacial, limb, ribs	Homo sapiens, Mus musculus	
GABA-A receptor (chloride channel)	Angelman syndrome - craniofacial (e.g., cleft palate) and hand patterning	Homo sapiens, Mus musculus	
TMEM16A chloride channel	Tracheal morphogenesis	Mus musculus	
Girk2 K^{+} channel	Cerebellar development defects	Mus musculus	
KCNH2 K^{+} channel	Cardiac, craniofacial patterning defects	Mus musculus	
KCNQ1 K^{+} channel	Abnormalities of rectum, pancreas, and stomach	Mus musculus	
NaV1.2	Muscle and nerve repair defects	Xenopus	
Kir6.1 K^{+} channel	Eye patterning defects	Xenopus	
V-ATPase ion pump	Left-right asymmetry defects, muscle and nerve repair	Xenopus, Gallus gallus domesticus, Danio rerio	
H,K-ATPase ion pump	Left-right asymmetry defects	Xenopus, Echinoidea	
Kir7.1 K^{+} channel	Melanosome development defects	Danio rerio	
Kv channels	Fin size regulation, heart size regulation	Danio rerio, Mus musculus	
NaV 1.5, Na^{+}/K^{+}-ATPase	Cardiac morphogenesis	Danio rerio	
KCNC3	Dominant mutations cause cerebellar displasia in humans, and wing venation and eye defects in Drosophila.	Homo sapiens, Drosophila	

Table 2: gap junctions implicated in patterning
Gap Junction Protein	Morphogenetic role or LOF phenotype	Species	References
Innexins	Gonad and germline morphogenesis	C. Elegans	
Innexin1,2	Cuticle (epithelial) patterning, foregut development	Drosophila	
Innexin 2	Eye size	Drosophila	
Cx43	Oculodentodigital dysplasia (ODDD), heart defects (outflow tract and conotruncal), left-right asymmetry randomization, Osteoblast differentiation problems, craniofacial defects, myogenesis	Homo sapiens, Mus musculus, Gallus gallus domesticus	
Cx37	Lymphatic system patterning	Mus musculus	
Cx45	Cardiac defects (cushion patterning)	Mus musculus	
Cx50, Cx46	Eye defects (differentiation and proliferation problems, especially lens),	Mus musculus	
Cx26	Cochlear development defects	Mus musculus	
Cx41.8	Pigmentation pattern defects	Danio rerio	
Cx43	Fin size and pattern regulation Craniofrontonasal syndrome	Danio rerio, Mus musculus	
Inx4,Inx2	Germline differentiation and spermatogenesis	Drosophila	
Pannexin3	Skeletal development	Mus musculus	

Table 3: ion channel oncogenes
Protein	Species	References	Cancer-role
NaV 1.5 channel	Homo sapiens		Oncogene
ERG potassium channels	Homo sapiens		Oncogene
9 potassium channel	Mus musculus		Oncogene
Ductin (proton V-ATPase component)	Mus musculus		Oncogene
SLC5A8 sodium/butyrate transporter	Homo sapiens		Oncogene
KCNE2 potassium channel	Mus musculus		Oncogene
KCNQ1 potassium channel	Homo sapiens, mouse		Oncogene
SCN5A voltage-gated sodium channel	Homo sapiens		Oncogene
Metabotropic glutamate receptor	Mus musculus, Human		Oncogene
CFTR chloride channel	Homo sapiens		Tumor suppressor
Connexin43	Homo sapiens		Tumor suppressor
BKCa	Homo sapiens		Oncogene
Muscarinic Acetylcholine receptor	Homo sapiens, Mus musculus		Tumor suppressor
KCNJ3 (Girk)	Homo sapiens		Oncogene
