= Electron orbital =

An electron orbital may refer to:

- An atomic orbital, describing the behaviour of an electron in an atom
- A molecular orbital, describing the behaviour of an electron in a molecule

== See also ==
- Electron configuration, the arrangement of electrons in structures such as atoms or molecules
- Orbital hybridization, a combining of atomic orbitals to form an equal number of hybrid orbitals when forming certain molecules
