= Henry A. Bent =

Physical chemist

- Born: December 21, 1926; Cambridge, Massachusetts
- Died: January 3, 2015 (aged 88); Pittsburgh, Pennsylvania
- Education: University of California, Berkeley (Ph.D. 1952)
- Awards: George C. Pimentel Award in Chemical Education (1980)
- Scientific career
- Workplaces: University of Connecticut University of Minnesota (1958-69) North Carolina State University, Raleigh (1969-89) University of Pittsburgh (1989-92)

Henry A. Bent (December 21, 1926 – January 3, 2015) was a professor of physical chemistry who studied molecular orbitals to develop atomic hybridization and valence bond theories. Bent's rule, which predicts the orbital hybridization of a central atom as a function of the electronegativities of the substituents attached to it, is named for him.

In thermodynamics he developed a global approach now known as "entropy analysis" for the entropy component of thermodynamic free energy in relation to the second law of thermodynamics and the spontaneity of various chemical processes.

Bent was also interested in the periodic laws of the elements and promoted the left-step periodic table based on orbital-filling rules.
