= Bent bond =

Type of covalent bond in organic chemistry

One of the first bent bond theories for cyclopropane was the Coulson-Moffitt model (1947).

In organic chemistry, a bent bond, also known as a banana bond, is a type of covalent chemical bond with a geometry somewhat reminiscent of a banana. The term itself is a general representation of electron density or configuration resembling a similar "bent" structure within small ring molecules, such as cyclopropane (C_{3}H_{6}) or as a representation of double or triple bonds within a compound that is an alternative to the sigma and pi bond model.

== Small cyclic molecules ==
A humorously literal depiction of the banana bonds in cyclopropane

Bent bonds are a special type of chemical bonding in which the ordinary hybridization state of two atoms making up a chemical bond are modified with increased or decreased s-orbital character in order to accommodate a particular molecular geometry. Bent bonds are found in strained organic compounds such as cyclopropane, oxirane and aziridine.

In these compounds, it is not possible for the carbon atoms to assume the 109.5° bond angles with standard sp^{3} hybridization. Increasing the p-character to sp^{5} (i.e. 1/6 s-density and 5/6 p-density) makes it possible to reduce the bond angles to 60°. At the same time, the carbon-to-hydrogen bonds gain more s-character, which shortens them. In cyclopropane, the maximum electron density between two carbon atoms does not correspond to the internuclear axis, hence the name bent bond. In cyclopropane, the interorbital angle is 104°. This bending can be observed experimentally by X-ray diffraction of certain cyclopropane derivatives: the deformation density is outside the line of centers between the two carbon atoms. The carbon–carbon bond lengths are shorter than in a regular alkane bond: 151 pm versus 153 pm.

Cyclobutane is a larger ring, but still has bent bonds. In this molecule, the carbon bond angles are 90° for the planar conformation and 88° for the puckered one. Unlike in cyclopropane, the C–C bond lengths actually increase rather than decrease; this is mainly due to 1,3-nonbonded steric repulsion. In terms of reactivity, cyclobutane is relatively inert and behaves like ordinary alkanes.

=== Walsh orbital model ===
An alternative model utilizes semi-localized Walsh orbitals in which cyclopropane is described as a carbon sp^{2} sigma bonding and in-plane pi bonding system. Critics of the Walsh orbital theory argue that this model does not represent the ground state of cyclopropane as it cannot be transformed into the localized or fully delocalized descriptions via a unitary transformation.

== Double and triple bonds ==
Two different explanations for the nature of double and triple covalent bonds in organic molecules were proposed in the 1930s. Linus Pauling proposed that the double bond results from two equivalent tetrahedral orbitals from each atom, which later came to be called banana bonds or tau bonds. Erich Hückel proposed a representation of the double bond as a combination of a sigma bond plus a pi bond. The Hückel representation is the better-known one, and it is the one found in most textbooks since the late-20th century.

Both models represent the same total electron density, with the orbitals related by a unitary transformation. We can construct the two equivalent bent bond orbitals h and h' by taking linear combinations h = c_{1}σ + c_{2}π and h' = c_{1}σ – c_{2}π for an appropriate choice of coefficients c_{1} and c_{2}. In a 1996 review, Kenneth B. Wiberg concluded that "although a conclusive statement cannot be made on the basis of the currently available information, it seems likely that we can continue to consider the σ/π and bent-bond descriptions of ethylene to be equivalent." Ian Fleming goes further in a 2010 textbook, noting that "the overall distribution of electrons [...] is exactly the same" in the two models.

== Other applications ==
The bent bond theory can also explain other phenomena in organic molecules. For instance, in fluoromethane (CH_{3}F), Bent's rule states that there should be more p-orbital character in the C–F bond and more s-orbital character in the C–H bonds, compared to the equal distribution in an ideal sp^{3} hybridization. This should result in H–C–H bond angles approaching those of sp^{2} orbitals – i.e. 120° – and smaller F–C–H bond angles. However, the experimental F–C–H bond angle is 109°, which is greater than the calculated value. The difference is explained in terms of bent C–H bonds.

Bent bonds also come into play in the gauche effect, explaining the preference for gauche conformations in certain substituted alkanes and the alkene cis effect associated with some unusually stable alkene cis isomers.
