= Fluoromethane =

Stick model of fluoromethane
Spacefill model of fluoromethane

Names
- IUPAC name Fluoromethane
- Other names Freon 41; Methyl fluoride Halocarbon 41; Monofluoromethane

Identifiers
CAS Number	593-53-3
3D model (JSmol)	Interactive image
Abbreviations	MeF; R41
Beilstein Reference	1730725
ChEBI	CHEBI:28826
ChEMBL	ChEMBL116838
ChemSpider	11148
ECHA InfoCard	100.008.907
EC Number	209-796-6
Gmelin Reference	391
KEGG	C11147
MeSH	Fluoromethane
PubChem CID	11638
UNII	54A9X6F0CM
UN number	UN 2454
CompTox Dashboard (EPA)	DTXSID6060474
- InChI: InChI=1S/CH3F/c1-2/h1H3 Key: NBVXSUQYWXRMNV-UHFFFAOYSA-N; InChI=1/CH3F/c1-2/h1H3 Key: NBVXSUQYWXRMNV-UHFFFAOYAF
- SMILES: FC

Properties
Chemical formula	CH_{3}F
Molar mass	34.033 g·mol^{−1}
Appearance	Colourless gas
Odor	pleasant, ether-like odour at high concentrations
Density	1.4397 g/L; 0.557 g/cm^{3} (liquid) at saturation pressure at 25 °C
Melting point	−137.8 °C (−216.0 °F; 135.3 K)
Boiling point	−78.4 °C (−109.1 °F; 194.8 K)
Solubility in water	1.66 L/kg (2.295 g/L)
Vapor pressure	3.3 MPa

Hazards
- GHS labelling
Pictograms	(GHS02: Flammable)
Signal word	Danger
Hazard statements	H220
Precautionary statements	P210, P377, P381, P403, P410+P403
NFPA 704 (fire diamond)	1 4 0
- Except where otherwise noted, data are given for materials in their standard state (at 25 °C [77 °F], 100 kPa). verify (what is ?) Infobox references

Fluoromethane, also known as methyl fluoride, Freon 41, Halocarbon-41 and HFC-41, is a non-toxic, liquefiable, and flammable gas at standard temperature and pressure. It is made of carbon, hydrogen, and fluorine. The name stems from the fact that it is methane (CH_{4}) with a fluorine atom substituted for one of the hydrogen atoms. It is used in semiconductor manufacturing processes as an etching gas in plasma etch reactors.

Fluoromethane (originally called "fluorohydrate of methylene") became the first organofluorine compound to be discovered when it was synthesized by French chemists Jean-Baptiste Dumas and Eugène-Melchior Péligot in 1835 by distilling dimethyl sulfate with potassium fluoride.

== Composition ==
The compound is the lowest mass member of the hydrofluorocarbon (HFC) family, compounds which contain only hydrogen, fluorine, and carbon. These compounds are related to the chlorofluorocarbons (CFC), but since they do not contain chlorine, are not destructive to the ozone layer. Fluorocarbons are, however, potent greenhouse gasses, and the Kigali Amendment to the Montreal Protocol is an attempt to phase them out due to their contribution to global warming.

The C−F bond energy is 552 kJ/mol and its length is 0.139 nm. Its molecular geometry is tetrahedral. Its Dipole Moment is 1.85 D.

Its specific heat capacity (C_{p}) is 38.171 J·mol^{−1}·K^{−1} at 25 °C. The critical point of fluoromethane is at 44.9 °C (318.1 K) and 6.280 MPa.

== See also ==
- Organofluorine chemistry
- Halomethanes
