= Natural bond orbital =

Bonding orbital used in quantum chemistry

In quantum chemistry, a natural bond orbital or NBO is a calculated bonding orbital with maximum electron density. The NBOs are one of a sequence of natural localized orbital sets that include "natural atomic orbitals" (NAO), "natural hybrid orbitals" (NHO), "natural bonding orbitals" (NBO) and "natural (semi-)localized molecular orbitals" (NLMO). These natural localized sets are intermediate between basis atomic orbitals (AO) and molecular orbitals (MO):

Atomic orbital → NAO → NHO → NBO → NLMO → Molecular orbital

Natural (localized) orbitals are used in computational chemistry to calculate the distribution of electron density in atoms and in bonds between atoms. They have the "maximum-occupancy character" in localized 1-center and 2-center regions of the molecule. Natural bond orbitals (NBOs) include the highest possible percentage of the electron density, ideally close to 2.000, providing the most accurate possible “natural Lewis structure” of ψ. A high percentage of electron density (denoted %-ρ_{L}), often found to be >99% for common organic molecules, correspond with an accurate natural Lewis structure.

The concept of natural orbitals was first introduced by Per-Olov Löwdin in 1955, to describe the unique set of orthonormal 1-electron functions that are intrinsic to the N-electron wavefunction.

== Theory ==
Each bonding NBO σ_{AB} (the donor) can be written in terms of two directed valence hybrids (NHOs) h_{A}, h_{B} on atoms A and B, with corresponding polarization coefficients c_{A}, c_{B}:

σ_{AB} = c_{A} h_{Α} + c_{B} h_{B}

The bonds vary smoothly from covalent (c_{A} = c_{B}) to ionic (c_{A} >> c_{B}) limit.

Each valence bonding NBO σ must be paired with a corresponding valence antibonding NBO σ* (the acceptor) to complete the span of the valence space:

σ_{AB}* = c_{A} h_{Α} − c_{B} h_{B}

The bonding NBOs are of the "Lewis orbital"-type (occupation numbers near 2); antibonding NBOs are of the "non-Lewis orbital"-type (occupation numbers near 0). In an idealized Lewis structure, full Lewis orbitals (two electrons) are complemented by formally empty non-Lewis orbitals. Weak occupancies of the valence antibonds signal irreducible departures from an idealized localized Lewis structure, which means true "delocalization effects".

== Lewis structures ==
Resonance structures of an amide

With a computer program that can calculate NBOs, optimal Lewis structures can be found. An optimal Lewis structure can be defined as that one with the maximum amount of electronic charge in Lewis orbitals (Lewis charge). A low amount of electronic charge in Lewis orbitals indicates strong effects of electron delocalization.

In resonance structures, major and minor contributing structures may exist. For amides, for example, NBO calculations show that the structure with a carbonyl double bond is the dominant Lewis structure. However, in NBO calculations, "covalent-ionic resonance" is not needed due to the inclusion of bond-polarity effects in the resonance structures. This is similar to other modern valence bond theory methods.

== See also ==
- Molecular orbital theory
- Basis set (chemistry)
