= Sulfate =

Anion of sulfur with 4 oxygen atoms

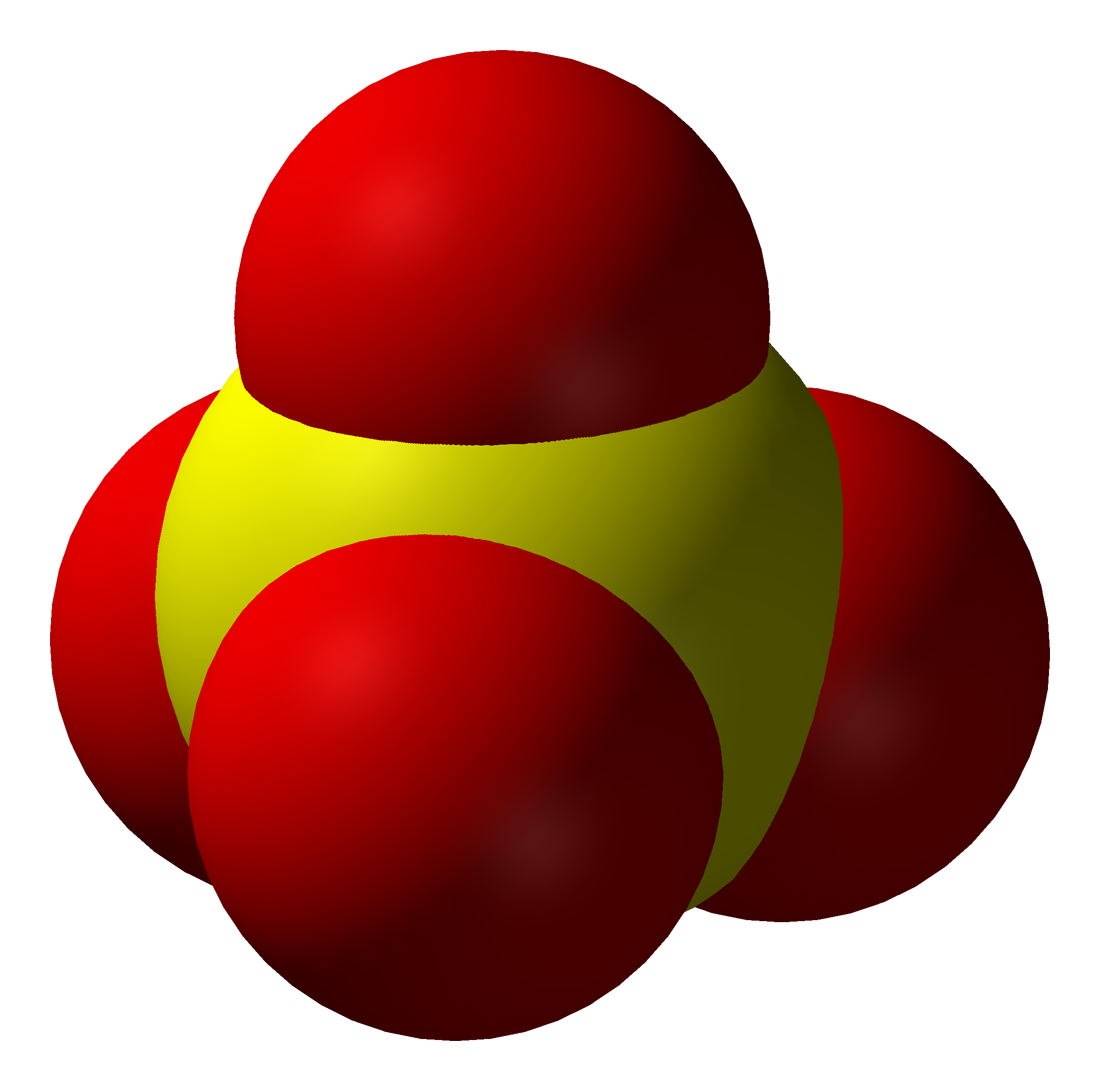

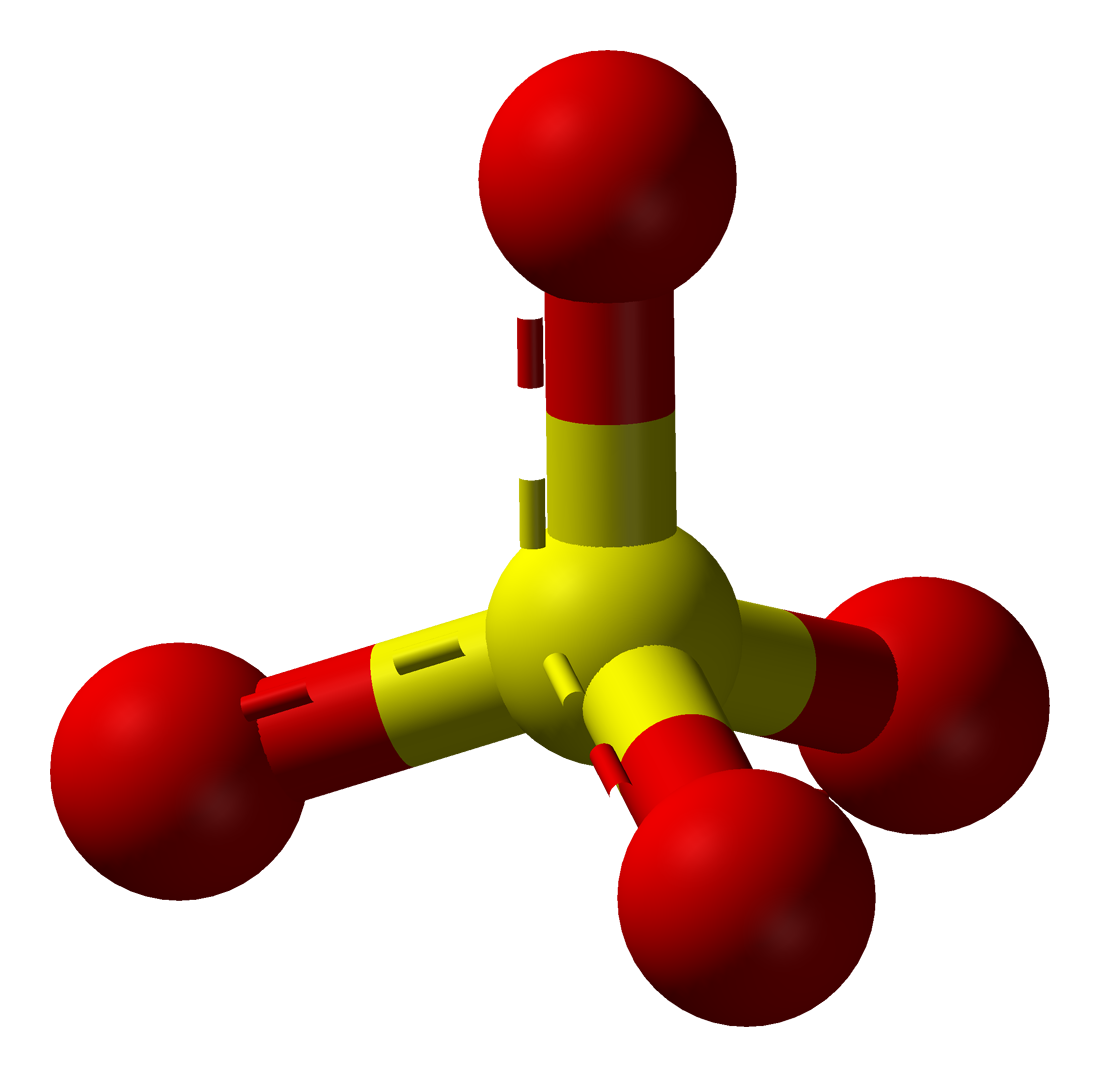

Names
- IUPAC name Sulfate
- Other names Tetraoxosulfate(VI); Tetraoxidosulfate(VI)

Identifiers
CAS Number	14808-79-8
3D model (JSmol)	Interactive image
ChEBI	CHEBI:16189
ChemSpider	1085
EC Number	233-334-2
PubChem CID	1117
UNII	7IS9N8KPMG
- InChI: InChI=1S/H2O4S/c1-5(2,3)4/h(H2,1,2,3,4)/p-2 Key: QAOWNCQODCNURD-UHFFFAOYSA-L; InChI=1/H2O4S/c1-5(2,3)4/h(H2,1,2,3,4)/p-2 Key: QAOWNCQODCNURD-NUQVWONBAM
- SMILES: S(=O)(=O)([O-])[O-]

Properties
Chemical formula	SO_{4}^{2−}
Molar mass	96.06 g·mol^{−1}
Conjugate acid	Hydrogensulfate
- Except where otherwise noted, data are given for materials in their standard state (at 25 °C [77 °F], 100 kPa). Infobox references

The sulfate or sulphate ion is a polyatomic anion with the empirical formula SO_{4}^{2−}. Salts, acid derivatives, and peroxides of sulfate are widely used in industry. Sulfates occur widely in everyday life. Sulfates are salts of sulfuric acid and many are prepared from that acid.

== Spelling ==
"Sulfate" is the spelling recommended by IUPAC, but "sulphate" is traditionally used in British English.

== Structure ==
The sulfate anion consists of a central sulfur atom surrounded by four equivalent oxygen atoms in a tetrahedral arrangement. The symmetry of the isolated anion is the same as that of methane. The sulfur atom is in the +6 oxidation state while the four oxygen atoms are each in the −2 state. The sulfate ion carries an overall charge of −2 and it is the conjugate base of the bisulfate (or hydrogensulfate) ion, HSO_{4}^{−}, which is in turn the conjugate base of H_{2}SO_{4}, sulfuric acid. Organic sulfate esters, such as dimethyl sulfate, are covalent compounds and esters of sulfuric acid. The tetrahedral molecular geometry of the sulfate ion is as predicted by VSEPR theory.

== Bonding ==
Two models of the sulfate ion. 1 with polar covalent bonds only; 2 with an ionic bond

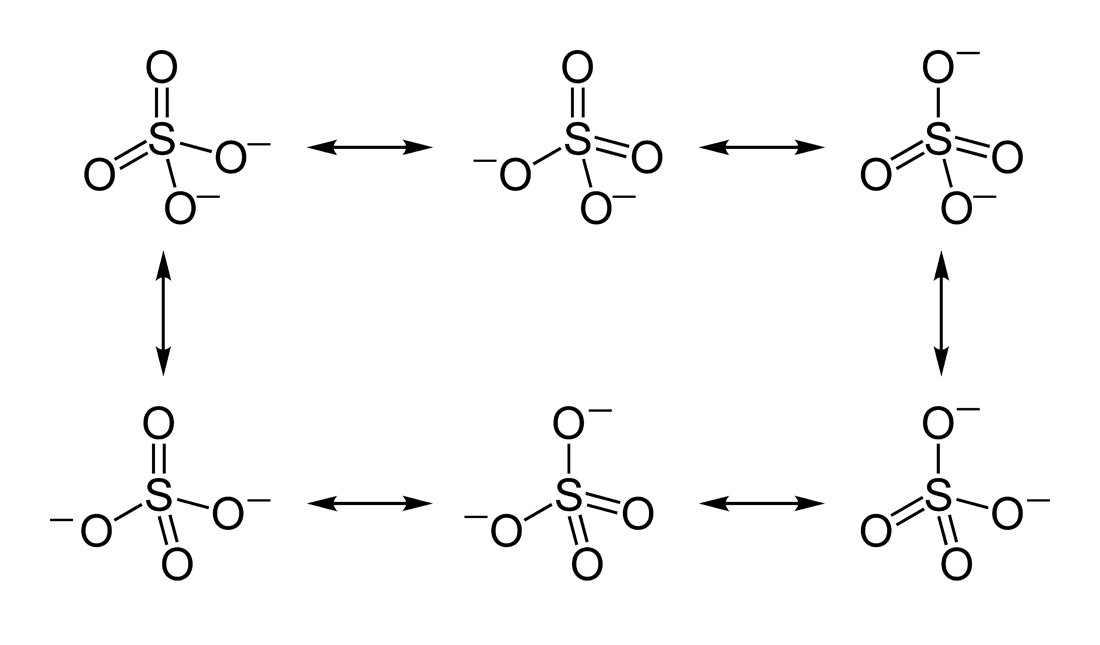
Six resonances

The first description of the bonding in modern terms was by Gilbert Lewis in his groundbreaking paper of 1916, where he described the bonding in terms of electron octets around each atom. There are two double bonds, and there is a formal charge of 2 on the sulfur atom and −1 on each oxygen atom. (Note: Lewis assigned to sulfur a negative charge of two, starting from six own valence electrons and ending up with eight electrons shared with the oxygen atoms. In fact, sulfur donates two electrons to the oxygen atoms.)

Later, Linus Pauling used valence bond theory to propose that the most significant resonance canonicals had two pi bonds involving d orbitals. His reasoning was that the charge on sulfur was thus reduced, in accordance with his principle of electroneutrality. The S−O bond length of 149 pm is shorter than the bond lengths in sulfuric acid of 157 pm for S−OH. The double bonding was taken by Pauling to account for the shortness of the S−O bond.

Pauling's use of d orbitals provoked a debate on the relative importance of pi bonding and bond polarity (electrostatic attraction) in causing the shortening of the S−O bond. The outcome was a broad consensus that d orbitals play a role, but are not as significant as Pauling had believed.

A widely accepted description involving pπ – dπ bonding was initially proposed by Durward William John Cruickshank. In this model, fully occupied p orbitals on oxygen overlap with empty sulfur d orbitals (principally the d_{z^{2}} and d_{x^{2}–y^{2}}). However, in this description, despite there being some π character to the S−O bonds, the bond has significant ionic character. For sulfuric acid, computational analysis (with natural bond orbitals) confirms a clear positive charge on sulfur (theoretically +2.45) and a low 3d occupancy. Therefore, the representation with four single bonds is the optimal Lewis structure rather than the one with two double bonds (thus the Lewis model, not the Pauling model).

In the model with four single bonds, the structure obeys the octet rule and the charge distribution is in agreement with the electronegativity of the atoms. The discrepancy between the S−O bond length in the sulfate ion and the S−OH bond length in sulfuric acid is explained by donation of p-orbital electrons from the terminal S=O bonds in sulfuric acid into the antibonding S−OH orbitals, weakening them resulting in the longer bond length of the latter.

However, Pauling's representation for sulfate and other main group compounds with oxygen is still a common way of representing the bonding in many textbooks. The apparent contradiction can be clarified if one realizes that the covalent double bonds in the Lewis structure actually represent bonds that are strongly polarized by more than 90% towards the oxygen atom. On the other hand, in the structure with a dipolar bond, the charge is localized as a lone pair on the oxygen.

== Preparation ==
Typically metal sulfates are prepared by treating metal oxides, metal carbonates, or the metal itself with sulfuric acid:

Zn + H_{2}SO_{4} → ZnSO_{4} + H_{2}
Cu(OH)_{2} + H_{2}SO_{4} → CuSO_{4} + 2 H_{2}O
CdCO_{3} + H_{2}SO_{4} → CdSO_{4} + H_{2}O + CO_{2}

Although written with simple anhydrous formulas, these conversions generally are conducted in the presence of water. Consequently the product sulfates are hydrated, corresponding to zinc sulfate ZnSO_{4}·7H_{2}O, copper(II) sulfate CuSO_{4}·5H_{2}O, and cadmium sulfate CdSO_{4}·H_{2}O.

Some metal sulfides can be oxidized to give metal sulfates.

== Properties ==
There are numerous examples of ionic sulfates, many of which are highly soluble in water. Exceptions include calcium sulfate, strontium sulfate, lead(II) sulfate, barium sulfate, silver sulfate, and mercury sulfate, which are poorly soluble. Radium sulfate is the most insoluble sulfate known. The barium derivative is useful in the gravimetric analysis of sulfate: if one adds a solution of most barium salts, for instance barium chloride, to a solution containing sulfate ions, barium sulfate will precipitate out of solution as a whitish powder. This is a common laboratory test to determine if sulfate anions are present. Sulfate, being a Lewis base, forms a variety of metal complexes.

== Uses and occurrence ==
=== Commercial applications ===
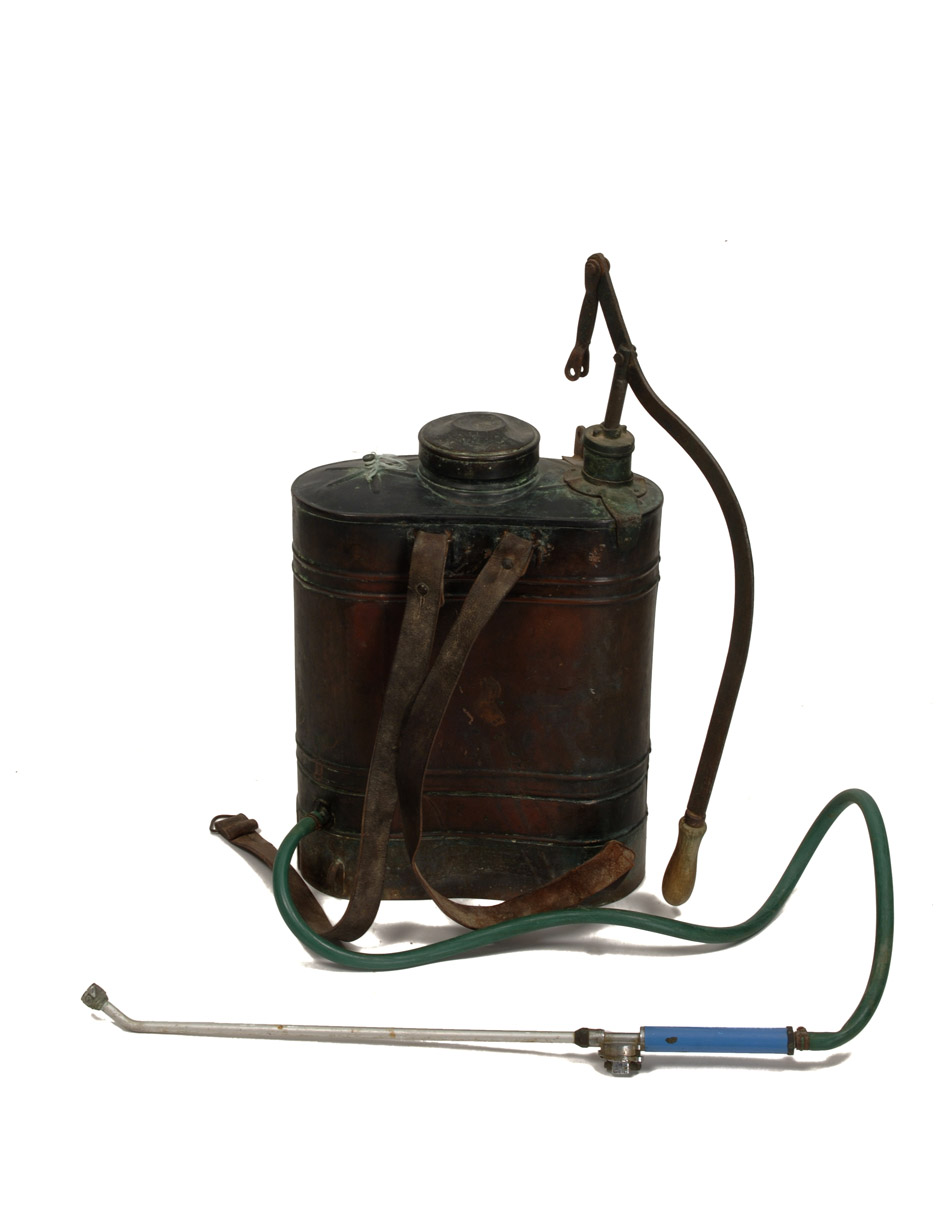
Knapsack sprayer used to apply sulfate to vegetables. Valencian Museum of Ethnology.

Sulfates are widely used industrially. It is used as a source of sulfide in pulp and paper industry via the Kraft process.

Gypsum, the natural mineral form of hydrated calcium sulfate, is used to produce plaster. About 100 million tonnes per year are used by the construction industry.

=== Specific sulfates ===
Many individual sulfate salts are used in small quantities.

- Copper sulfate, a common fungicide, the more stable pentahydrate form (CuSO_{4}·5H_{2}O) is used for Bordeaux mixture in agriculture, galvanic cells as electrolyte and pigment.
- Iron(II) sulfate, a common form of iron in mineral supplements for humans, animals, and soil for plants.
- Magnesium sulfate (commonly known as Epsom salts), used in therapeutic baths.
- Lead(II) sulfate, produced on both plates during the discharge of a lead–acid battery.
- Polyhalite, K_{2}Ca_{2}Mg(SO_{4})_{4}·2H_{2}O, used as fertiliser.

=== Occurrence in nature ===
Sulfate-reducing bacteria, some anaerobic microorganisms, such as those living in sediment or near deep sea thermal vents, use the reduction of sulfates coupled with the oxidation of organic compounds or hydrogen as an energy source for chemosynthesis.

== History ==
Various forms of calcium sulfate have been used as building materials since the Bronze Age, and other sulfates have been utilized since at least antiquity. However, the first salts of this group were chemically described only in the 17th century. The production of sulfuric acid esters, as well as their biological significance and natural occurrence, has been known only since the 19th century.

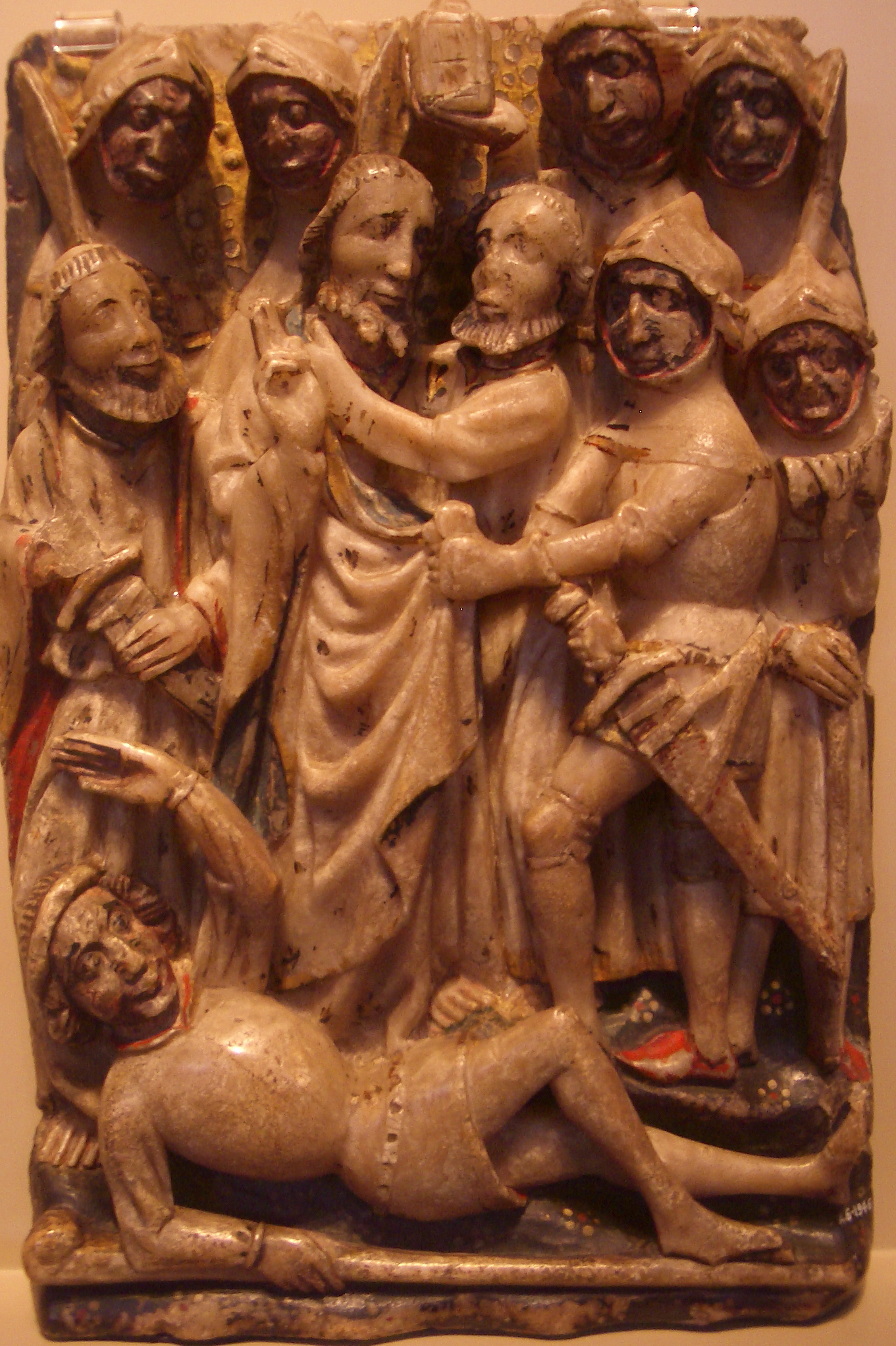
Medieval alabaster relief from Great Britain

In the eastern Mediterranean and the Middle East, the use of mortar was widespread thousands of years ago. In ancient Egypt, its application is documented as early as the third millennium BC. Archaeological sites demonstrating its use include the Old Palace of Aššur and the ruins of Amarna. In the Parthian Empire, plaster mortar was employed in the construction of vaults. From the period of the Roman Empire until the 19th century, lime mortar (containing calcium carbonate) was far more widely used, although gypsum mortar continued to be applied to a limited extent during the Middle Ages, for example in France. The use of calcium sulfate in cement has been investigated since the late 19th century and has been widely adopted since the 1930s. During the Bronze Age, alabaster was extensively used for decorative architectural elements in the Minoan culture. Toward the end of the Bronze Age, gypsum alabaster from Cretan quarries was exported and used elsewhere, for example for benches in Mycenae. In the ruins of Akrotiri on Santorinii, it was used for floor tiles. Alabaster is easily worked and became a common and highly valued material for sculptures and monuments during the Middle Ages and the modern period. It was quarried primarily in central England, northern Spain, and the French Alps, and traded over long distances. In 1550, religious sculptures were banned in England (see Reformation iconoclasm), leading to the large-scale export of alabaster figures to France.

Some sulfates were known to alchemists. The vitriol salts, from the Latin vitreolum, glassy, were so-called because they were some of the first transparent crystals known. Green vitriol is iron(II) sulfate heptahydrate, FeSO_{4}·7H_{2}O; blue vitriol is copper(II) sulfate pentahydrate, CuSO_{4}·5H_{2}O and white vitriol is zinc sulfate heptahydrate, ZnSO_{4}·7H_{2}O. Alum, a double sulfate of potassium and aluminium with the formula K_{2}Al_{2}(SO_{4})_{4}·24H_{2}O, figured in the development of the chemical industry.

Sulfates were historically used as dyes and pigments. In Ancient Egypt, anhydrite screed and jarosite, KFe_{3}(OH)_{6}(SO_{4})_{2}, were employed in wall decoration. The pigment jarosite has also been identified in Central America in vessels from a burial site in Teotihuacán. The use of iron gall ink was widespread during the Middle Ages and continued into the modern era. It was prepared from plant gall and iron(II) sulfate. Alum (potassium aluminum sulfate) was formerly used in leather production (tanning), possibly as early as ancient Egypt. It was certainly known in classical antiquity in Rome and Greece. Alum tanning was widespread in antiquity and the Middle Ages; however, the effect was not permanent, as the alum could be washed out of the leather. Throughout the Middle Ages, alum was an important industrial product. In addition to its use in leather processing, it served as a mordant in wool dyeing. From the mid-19th century onward, it was gradually replaced by other compounds, particularly aluminum sulfate, and is now of only minor significance.

The first sulfuric acid salts were identified as such in the 17th century. Sodium sulfate, specifically its decahydrate known as Glauber's salt, was described around 1625 by Johann Rudolph Glauber. He analyzed water from a medicinal spring near Naples and isolated sodium sulfate, which he named Sal mirabile. Several years later, he determined that sodium sulfate could be produced from rock salt (sodium chloride) and sulfuric acid. Magnesium sulfate obtained from a mineral spring in Epsom, England, was scientifically described at the end of the 17th century. Both the spring water and the isolated salt exhibited medicinal properties and were used as a laxative and for the treatment of headaches.

The medical application of plaster for the treatment of bone fracture began in the early 19th century. Initially, wooden boxes filled with cast plaster were used. Although widespread in Europe, this method was impractical because the heavy plaster constructions confined patients to bed. Plaster-impregnated bandages for plaster casts were introduced in the mid-19th century and were initially prepared fresh in hospitals. Ready-to-use plaster bandages did not become commercially available until the 1930s. Another important medical development was the use of magnesium sulfate for the treatment of seizures during pregnancy (eclampsia). This application was first reported in 1916. By 1930, magnesium sulfate had largely replaced less suitable treatments, such as opioids, and contributed significantly to the reduction of maternal mortality.

=== Effects on climate ===
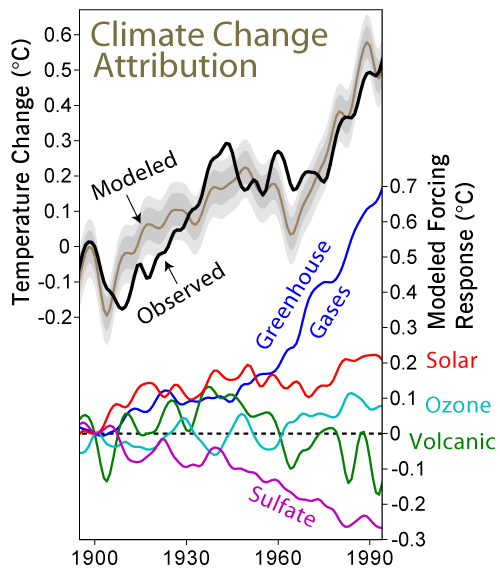
This figure shows the level of agreement between a climate model driven by five factors and the historical temperature record. The negative component identified as "sulfate" is associated with the aerosol emissions blamed for global dimming.

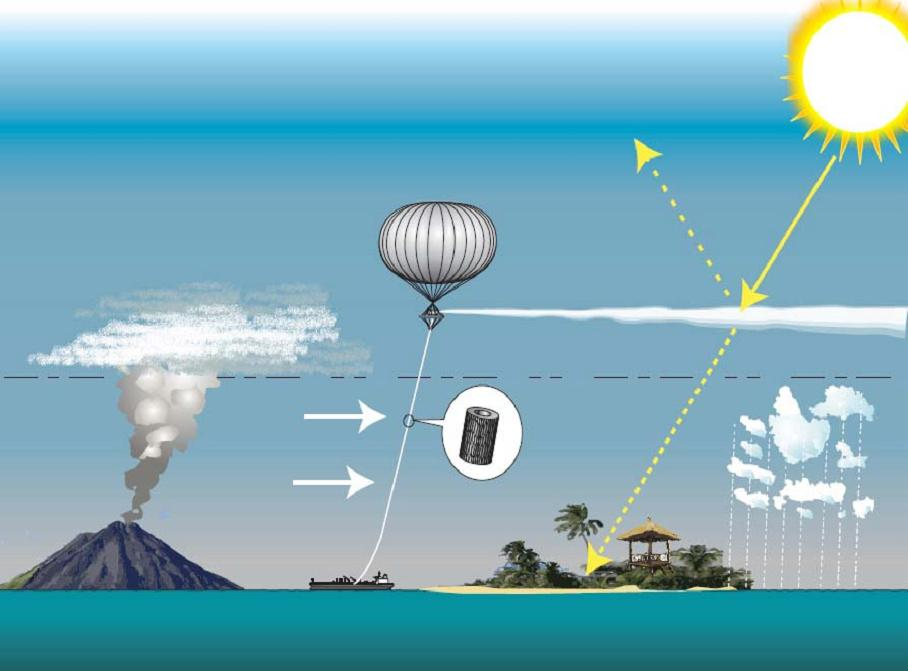
Proposed tethered balloon to inject aerosols into the stratosphere.

In the area of solar geoengineering sulfate aerosols are examined for their effects on the atmosphere, i.e. aerosol cooling. Many scientists also see the other side of this research, which is learning how to cause the same effect artificially. While discussed around the 1990s, if not earlier, stratospheric aerosol injection as a solar geoengineering method is best associated with Paul Crutzen's detailed 2006 proposal. Deploying in the stratosphere ensures that the aerosols are at their most effective, and that the progress of clean air measures would not be reversed: more recent research estimated that even under the highest-emission scenario RCP 8.5, the addition of stratospheric sulfur required to avoid 4 °C (7.2 °F) relative to now (and 5 °C (9.0 °F) relative to the preindustrial) would be effectively offset by the future controls on tropospheric sulfate pollution, and the amount required would be even less for less drastic warming scenarios. This spurred a detailed look at its costs and benefits, but even with hundreds of studies into the subject completed by the early 2020s, some notable uncertainties remain.

== Hydrogensulfate (bisulfate) ==
Hydrogensulfate

Names
- IUPAC name Hydrogensulfate
- Other names Bisulfate

Identifiers
CAS Number	14996-02-2
3D model (JSmol)	Interactive image
ChEBI	CHEBI:45696
ChemSpider	55666
Gmelin Reference	2121
PubChem CID	61778
- InChI: InChI=1S/H2O4S/c1-5(2,3)4/h(H2,1,2,3,4)/p-1 Key: QAOWNCQODCNURD-UHFFFAOYSA-M
- SMILES: O[S](=O)(=O)[O-]

Properties
Chemical formula	HSO_{4}^{−}
Molar mass	97.071 g/mol
Conjugate acid	Sulfuric acid
Conjugate base	Sulfate
- Except where otherwise noted, data are given for materials in their standard state (at 25 °C [77 °F], 100 kPa). Infobox references

The hydrogensulfate ion (HSO_{4}^{−}), also called the bisulfate ion, is the conjugate base of sulfuric acid (H_{2}SO_{4}). (Note: The prefix "bi" in "bisulfate" comes from an outdated naming system and is based on the observation that there is twice as much sulfate (SO_{4}^{2−}) in sodium bisulfate (NaHSO_{4}) and other bisulfates as in sodium sulfate (Na_{2}SO_{4}) and other sulfates. See also bicarbonate.) Sulfuric acid is classified as a strong acid; in aqueous solutions it ionizes completely to form hydronium (H_{3}O^{+}) and hydrogensulfate (HSO_{4}^{−}) ions. In other words, the sulfuric acid behaves as a Brønsted–Lowry acid and is deprotonated to form hydrogensulfate ion. Hydrogensulfate has a valency of 1. An example of a salt containing the HSO_{4}^{−} ion is sodium bisulfate, NaHSO_{4}. In dilute solutions the hydrogensulfate ions also dissociate, forming more hydronium ions and sulfate ions (SO_{4}^{2−}).

== Other sulfur oxyanions ==
Sulfur oxyanions
Molecular formula	Name
SO_{5}^{2−}	Peroxomonosulfate
SO_{4}^{2−}	Sulfate
SO_{3}^{2−}	Sulfite
S_{2}O_{8}^{2−}	Peroxydisulfate
S_{2}O_{7}^{2−}	Pyrosulfate
S_{2}O_{6}^{2−}	Dithionate
S_{2}O_{5}^{2−}	Metabisulfite
S_{2}O_{4}^{2−}	Dithionite
S_{2}O_{3}^{2−}	Thiosulfate
S_{3}O_{6}^{2−}	Trithionate
S_{4}O_{6}^{2−}	Tetrathionate

== See also ==
- Sulfonate
- Sulfation and desulfation of lead–acid batteries
- Sulfate-reducing microorganism
