= Field effect =

Field effect may refer to:

- Field effect (chemistry), an effect that a pole (either an unipole or dipole) has on a remote reaction centre (reaction rates, equilibrium)
- Field effect (semiconductor), the physical mechanism modulating the conductivity of a semiconductor using an applied voltage difference
- Field effect, also known as field cancerization, a field of molecular and cellular changes in normal appearing tissue, which predispose to the development of cancer
- Field Effect, a Canadian cybersecurity company
- Wien effect, in electrolytes, an increase in ionic mobility or conductivity of electrolytes at very high gradient of electrical potential
