= Ammonium hypoiodite =

Type of chemical compound

Ammonium hypoiodites are a class of reactive intermediates used in certain organic oxidation reactions. They consist of either ammonium itself or an alkylammonium with various substituents as cation, paired with a hypoiodite anion as the active oxidant. The hypoiodite is generated in situ from the analogous iodide reagent using peroxides, oxone, peracids, or other strong oxidizing agents. The hypoiodite is then capable of oxidizing various organic substrates. The iodide is regenerated, meaning the reaction runs with the iodide/hypoiodite as a catalyst in the presence of excess of the original strong oxidizing agent.

Ammonium hypoiodites are capable of oxidizing benzylic methyl groups, initiating oxidative dearomatization, and oxidative decarboxylation of β-ketolactones. Similar to the β-ketolactone reaction, oxidative ether formation can be performed at the alpha position of various ketones. Using chiral ammonium cations can give high enantioselectivity of the alpha-etherification reaction, an example of an efficient chiral metal-free organocatalysis process.

Several guanidinium hypoiodites can also be used in the various oxidative-coupling reactions. The guanidinium cation has the added benefit of forming multiple ionic interactions or hydrogen bonds to the substrates. The conjugate acid of triazabicyclodecene is especially effective.
