= Transition metal sulfate complex =

Coordination complexes with one or more sulfate ligands

Some bonding modes in complexes of the sulfate ligand.

Transition metal sulfate complexes or sulfato complexes are coordination complexes with one or more sulfate ligands. Being the conjugate base of a strong acid (sulfuric acid), sulfate is not basic. It is more commonly a counterion in coordination chemistry, not a ligand.

== Bonding modes ==
Sulfate binds to metals through one, two, three, or all four oxygen atoms.

Among the handful of complexes containing sulfate (or sulfato) ligands, most examples feature unidentate or chelating bidentate sulfate. Well characterized xamples are found with cobalt(III) ammines since these complexes are exchange inert. Monodentate sulfate is found in [Co(tren)(NH_{3})(SO_{4})]^{+} (tren = tris(2-aminoethyl)amine) Although [Co(en)_{2}O_{2}SO_{2}]^{+} is unknown, [(en)_{2}Co(OS(O)_{2}O)_{2}Co(en)_{2}]^{2+} forms instead (en = ethylenediamine). Bidentate sulfate is observed crystallographically in [Co(tetraamine)O_{2}SO_{2}]^{+}. In the neutral metal complex [PtSO_{4}(PPh_{3})_{2}] the sulfate ion is acting as a bidentate ligand.

Sulfate function as a tridentate bridging ligand [Re_{3}Cl_{9}(SO_{4})]^{2−}.

All four oxygen atoms of sulfate bond to metals in some Dawson-type polyoxometalates, e.g. [S_{2}Mo_{18}O_{62}]^{4-}.

== Sulfate as a counterion ==
Tutton's salts, with the formula M'_{2}M(SO_{4})_{2}(H_{2}O)_{6} (M' = K^{+}, etc.; M = Fe^{2+}, etc.), illustrate the ability of water to outcompete sulfate as a ligand for M^{2+}. Similarly alums, such as chrome alum ([K(H_{2}O)_{6}][Cr(H_{2}O)_{6}][SO_{4}]_{2}), features [Cr(H_{2}O)_{6}]^{3+} with noncoordinated sulfate. In a related vein, some sulfato complexes confirmed by X-ray crystallography, convert to simple aquo complexes when dissolved in water. Copper(II) sulfate exemplifies this behavior, sulfate is bonded to copper in the crystal but dissociates upon dissolution.

== Synthesis ==
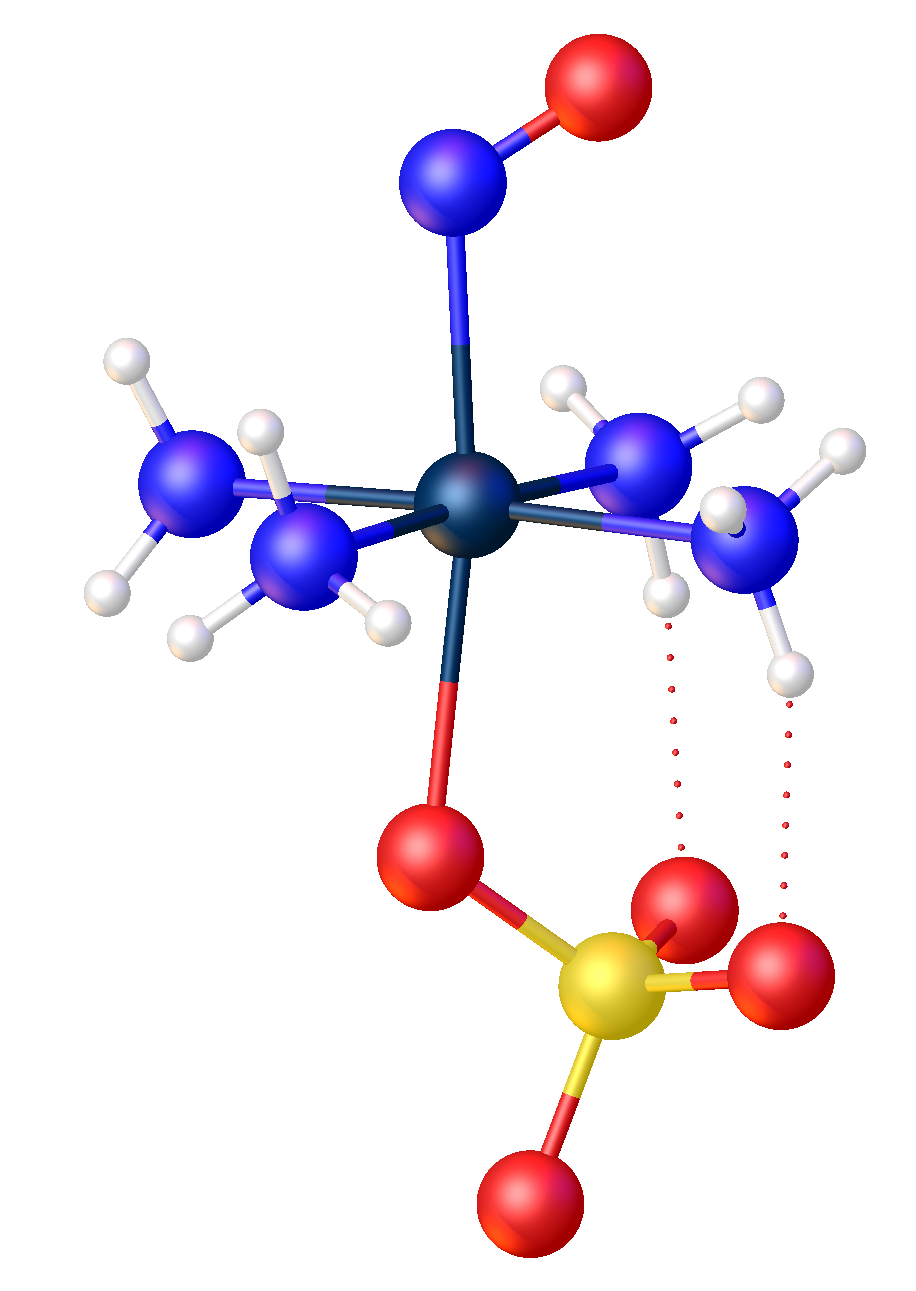
Structure of [Pt(NH_{3})_{4}(NO)(SO_{4})]^{+}. Selected bond distances: Pt-O, 2.284; S-O range from 1.496 to 1.462 Å. Color code: blue = N, red = O, dark blue = Pt.

Sulfato complexes are commonly produced by reaction of metal sulfates with other ligands.

In some cases, sulfato complexes are produced from sulfur dioxide:

Pt(O_{2})(PPh_{3})_{2} + SO_{2} → Pt(SO_{4})(PPh_{3})_{2} (PPh_{3} = triphenylphosphine)

Sulfato complexes also arise by air-oxidation of metal sulfides.

== Reactions ==
A dominant reaction of sulfato complexes is solvolysis, i.e. displacement of sulfate from the first coordination sphere by polar solvents such as water.

Sulfato complexes are susceptible to protonation of uncoordinated oxygen atoms.
