= Pauling's principle of electroneutrality =

Principle applying to all stable substances

Pauling's principle of electroneutrality states that each atom in a stable substance has a charge close to zero. It was formulated by Linus Pauling in 1948 and later revised. The principle has been used to predict which of a set of molecular resonance structures would be the most significant, to explain the stability of inorganic complexes and to explain the existence of π-bonding in compounds and polyatomic anions containing silicon, phosphorus or sulfur bonded to oxygen; it is still invoked in the context of coordination complexes. However, modern computational techniques indicate many stable compounds have a greater charge distribution than the principle predicts (they contain bonds with greater ionic character).

== History ==
Pauling first stated his "postulate of the essential electroneutrality of atoms" in his 1948 Liversidge lecture (in a broad-ranging paper that also included his ideas on the calculation of oxidation states in molecules):

“...the electronic structure of substances is such as to cause each atom to have essentially zero resultant electrical charge, the amount of leeway being not greater than about ± ½, and these resultant charges are possessed mainly by the most electropositive and electronegative atoms and are distributed in such a way as to correspond to electrostatic stability."

A slightly revised version was published in 1970:

“Stable molecules and crystals have electronic structures such that the electric charge of each atom is close to zero. Close to zero means between -1 and +1.”

Pauling said in his Liversidge lecture in 1948 that he had been led to the principle by a consideration of ionic bonding. In the gas phase, molecular caesium fluoride has a polar covalent bond. The large difference in electronegativity gives a calculated covalent character of 9%. In the crystal (CsF has the NaCl structure with both ions being 6-coordinate), if each bond has 9% covalent character, the total covalency of Cs and F would be 54%. This would be represented by one bond of around 50% covalent character resonating between the six positions, and the overall effect would be to reduce the charge on Cs to approximately +0.5 and on fluoride to approximately -0.5. It seemed reasonable to him that since CsF is the most ionic of ionic compounds, most, if not all, substances will have atoms with even smaller charges.

== Applications of the principle ==
=== Explanation of the structure adopted by hydrogen cyanide ===
There are two possible structures for hydrogen cyanide, HCN and CNH, differing only as to the position of the hydrogen atom. The structure with hydrogen attached to nitrogen, CNH, leads to formal charges of -1 on carbon and +1 on nitrogen, which the electronegativity of nitrogen and Pauling would partially compensate for, calculated the net charges on H, N and C as -0.79, +0.75 and +0.04, respectively. In contrast, the structure with hydrogen bonded to carbon, HCN, has formal charges on carbon and nitrogen of 0. The effect of the electronegativity of nitrogen would make the charges on H, C, and N +0.04, +0.17, and -0.21, respectively. The HCN structure is therefore favored.

=== Relative contribution of resonance structures (canonicals) ===
As an example the cyanate ion (OCN)^{−} can be assigned three resonance structures:

$$\ce{^-O-C{\equiv}N <-> O=C=N^- <-> {^+O{\equiv}C-N^{2-}}}$$

The rightmost structure in the diagram has a charge of -2 on the nitrogen atom. Applying the principle of electroneutrality, this can be identified as only a minor contributor. Additionally, as the most electronegative atom should carry the negative charge, the triple-bonded structure on the left is predicted to be the major contributor.

=== Stability of complexes ===
The hexammine cobalt(III) complex [Co(NH_{3})_{6}]^{3+} would have all of the charge on the central Co atom if the bonding to the ammonia molecules were electrostatic. On the other hand, a covalent linkage would lead to a charge of -3 on the metal and +1 on each of the nitrogen atoms in the ammonia molecules. Using the electroneutrality principle, it is assumed that the Co-N bond will have 50% ionic character, resulting in a net zero charge on the cobalt atom. Due to the difference in electronegativity, the N-H bond would have 17% ionic character and therefore a charge of 0.166 on each of the 18 hydrogen atoms. This essentially spreads the 3+ charge evenly onto the "surface" of the complex ion.

=== π-bonding in oxo compounds of Si, P, and S ===
Pauling invoked the principle of electroneutrality in a 1952 paper to suggest that pi bonding is present, for example, in molecules with 4 Si-O bonds. The oxygen atoms in such molecules would form polar covalent bonds with the silicon atom because their electronegativity (electron withdrawing power) was higher than that of silicon. Pauling calculated the charge buildup on the silicon atom due to the difference in electronegativity to be +2. The electroneutrality principle led Pauling to the conclusion that charge transfer from O to Si must occur using d orbitals forming a π-bond, and he calculated that this π-bonding accounted for the shortening of the Si-O bond.

== The adjacent charge rule ==
The "adjacent charge rule" was another principle of Pauling's for determining whether a resonance structure would make a significant contribution. First published in 1932, it stated that structures that placed charges of the same sign on adjacent atoms would be unfavorable.
