= Triazabicyclodecene =

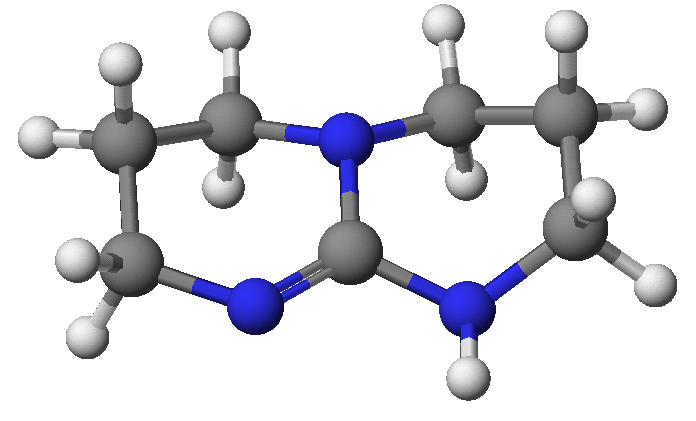

Names
- Preferred IUPAC name 1,3,4,6,7,8-Hexahydro-2H-pyrimido[1,2-a]pyrimidine
- Other names: 1,5,7-Triazabicyclo[4.4.0]dec-5-ene; Hexahydropyrimidopyrimidine

Identifiers
CAS Number	5807-14-7
3D model (JSmol)	Interactive image
Abbreviations	TBD; Hhpp
ChEBI	CHEBI:94622
ChemSpider	72164
ECHA InfoCard	100.024.880
EC Number	227-367-1
PubChem CID	79873
UNII	KAF7GN82TM
UN number	1759
CompTox Dashboard (EPA)	DTXSID10206793
- InChI: InChI=1S/C7H13N3/c1-3-8-7-9-4-2-6-10(7)5-1/h1-6H2,(H,8,9) Key: FVKFHMNJTHKMRX-UHFFFAOYSA-N; InChI=1/C7H13N3/c1-3-8-7-9-4-2-6-10(7)5-1/h1-6H2,(H,8,9) Key: FVKFHMNJTHKMRX-UHFFFAOYAP
- SMILES: N\2=C1/NCCCN1CCC/2

Properties
Chemical formula	C_{7}H_{13}N_{3}
Molar mass	139.20 g/mol
Appearance	Light yellow crystals
Melting point	125 to 130 °C (257 to 266 °F; 398 to 403 K)
Solubility in water	Soluble
Solubility in dimethylformamide	30 mg/ml
Solubility in dimethyl sulfoxide	30 mg/ml
Solubility in ethanol	30 mg/ml
Solubility in Phosphate-buffered saline	2 mg/ml (pH 7.2)
Acidity (pK_{a})	15.2±1.0

Hazards
- GHS labelling
Pictograms	(GHS05: Corrosive) (GHS07: Exclamation mark)
Signal word	Danger
Hazard statements	H302, H314, H412
Precautionary statements	P260, P264, P270, P273, P280, P301+P312+P330, P301+P330+P331, P303+P361+P353, P304+P340+P310, P305+P351+P338+P310, P363, P405, P501
NFPA 704 (fire diamond)	3 0 0
- Except where otherwise noted, data are given for materials in their standard state (at 25 °C [77 °F], 100 kPa). verify (what is ?) Infobox references

Triazabicyclodecene (1,5,7-triazabicyclo[4.4.0]dec-5-ene or TBD) is an organic compound consisting of a bicyclic guanidine. For a charge-neutral compound, it is a relatively strong base that is effective for a variety of organic transformations. TBD is colorless solid that is soluble in a variety of solvents.

== Reactivity ==
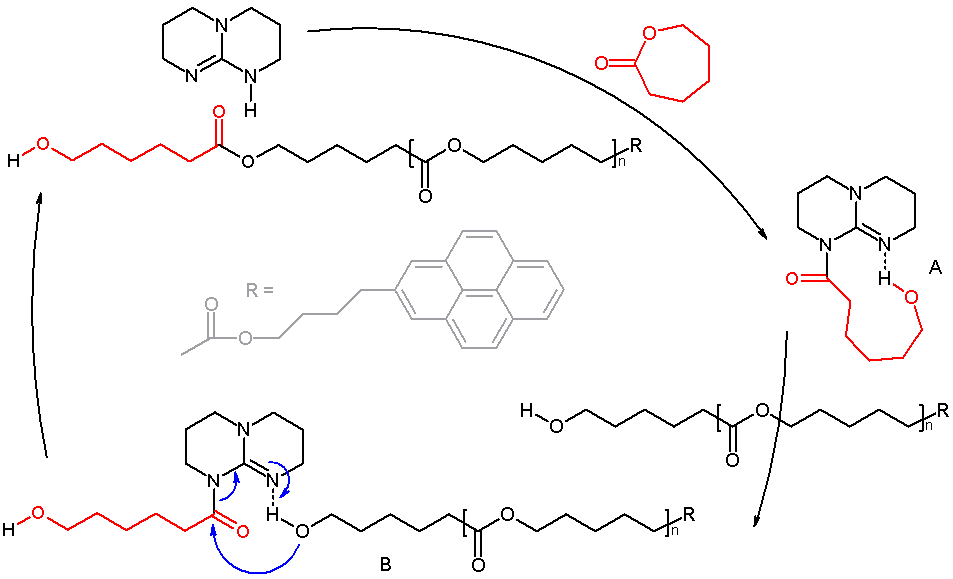
Mechanism proposed for the ring-opening polymerization of caprolactone to polycaprolactone by TBD. (Note: Reaction specs: initiator: 4-pyrenebutanol (pyrene enables end-group determination by UV–vis) and; Monomer: caprolactone added in ratio 1:100, Targeted degree of polymerization: 100; With TBD cat. 0.5% in benzene.; 72% conversion in 8 hours.; Polydispersity index: 1.16)

As a strong base, TBD fully deprotonates most phenols, carboxylic acids, and some carbon acids.

It catalyzes a variety of reactions including Michael reactions, Henry reactions, transesterification reactions, and Knoevenagel condensations.

Deprotonation at the 7-position gives a particularly electron-rich ligand as manifested in the redox properties of ditungsten tetra(hpp).

The conjugate acid of TBD is the preferred cation among the guanidinium hypoiodites, which are specialized oxidizing agents for various types of organic compounds.

== See also ==
- 1,5-Diazabicyclo(4.3.0)non-5-ene (DBN), a structurally related strong base
- 1,8-Diazabicyclo(5.4.0)undec-7-ene (DBU), a structurally related strong base
- 7-Methyl-TBD, a methyl derivative of TBD
