= Field effect (chemistry) =

Polarisation of a molecule through space due to localised electric charge

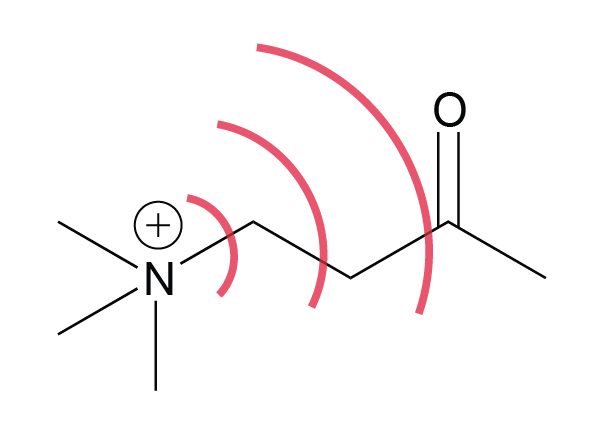
Field effect on a carbonyl arising from the formal charge on N in a quaternary ammonium salt.

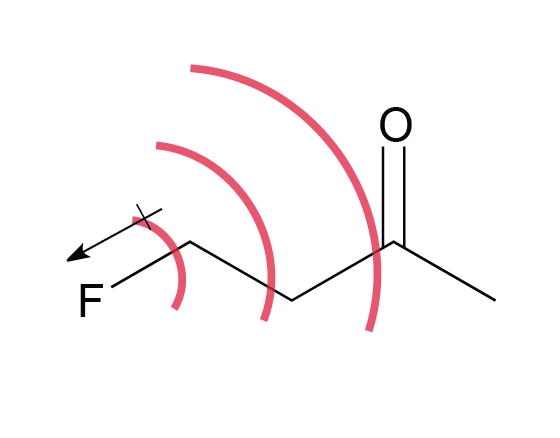
Field effect on a carbonyl arising from the dipole in a C-F bond.

A field effect is the polarization of a molecule through space. The effect is a result of an electric field produced by charge localization in a molecule. This field, which is substituent and conformation dependent, can influence structure and reactivity by manipulating the location of electron density in bonds and/or the overall molecule. The polarization of a molecule through its bonds is a separate phenomenon known as induction. Field effects are relatively weak, and diminish rapidly with distance, but have still been found to alter molecular properties such as acidity.

== Field sources ==
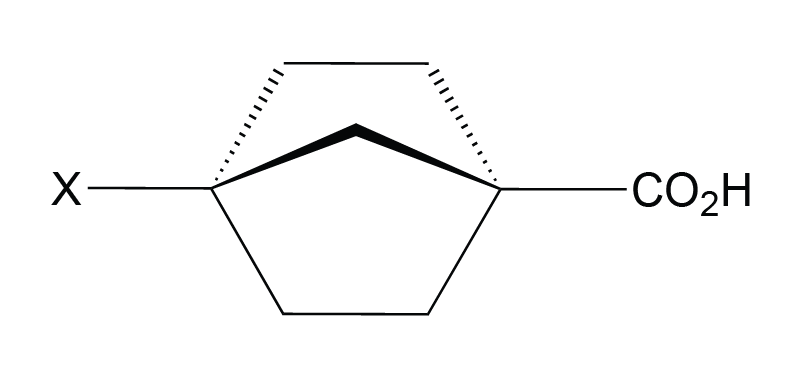
A bicycloheptane acid with an electron-withdrawing substituent, X, at the 4-position experiences a field effect on the acidic proton from the C-X bond dipole.

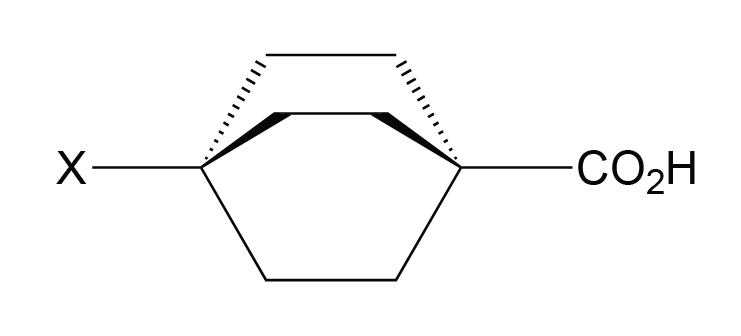
A bicyclooctance acid with an electron-witituent, X, at the 4-position experiences the same field effect on the acidic proton from the C-X bondole as the related bicylcoheptane.

Field effects can arise from the electric dipole field of a bond containing an electronegative atom or electron-withdrawing substituent, as well as from an atom or substituent bearing a formal charge. The directionality of a dipole, and concentration of charge, can both define the shape of a molecule's electric field which will manipulate the localization of electron density toward or away from sites of interest, such as an acidic hydrogen. Field effects are typically associated with the alignment of a dipole field with respect to a reaction center. Since these are through space effects, the 3D structure of a molecule is an important consideration. A field may be interrupted by other bonds or atoms before propagating to a reactive site of interest. Atoms of differing electronegativities can move closer together resulting in bond polarization through space that mimics the inductive effect through bonds. Bicycloheptane and bicyclooctane (seen left) are compounds in which the change in acidity with substitution was attributed to the field effect. The C-X dipole is oriented away from the carboxylic acid group, and can draw electron density away because the molecule center is empty, with a low dielectric constant, so the electric field is able to propagate with minimal resistance.

== Utility of effect ==
A dipole can align to stabilize or destabilize the formation or loss of a charge, thereby decreasing (if stabilized) or increasing (if destabilized) the activation barrier to a chemical event. Field effects can therefore tune the acidity or basicity of bonds within their fields by donating or withdrawing charge density. With respect to acidity, a common trend to note is that, inductively, an electron-withdrawing substituent in the vicinity of an acidic proton will lower the pKa (i.e. increase the acidity) and, correspondingly, an electron-donating substituent will raise the pKa. The reorganization of charge due to field effects will have the same result. An electric dipole field propagated through the space around, or in the middle of, a molecule in the direction of an acidic proton will decrease the acidity, while a dipole pointed away will increase the acidity and concomitantly elongate the X-H bond. These effects can therefore help to tune the acidity/basicity of a molecule to protonate/deprotonate a specific compound, or enhance hydrogen bond-donor ability for molecular recognition or anion sensing applications. Field effects have also been shown in substituted arenes to dominate the electrostatic potential maps, which are maps of electron density used to explain intermolecular interactions.

== Evidence for field effects ==
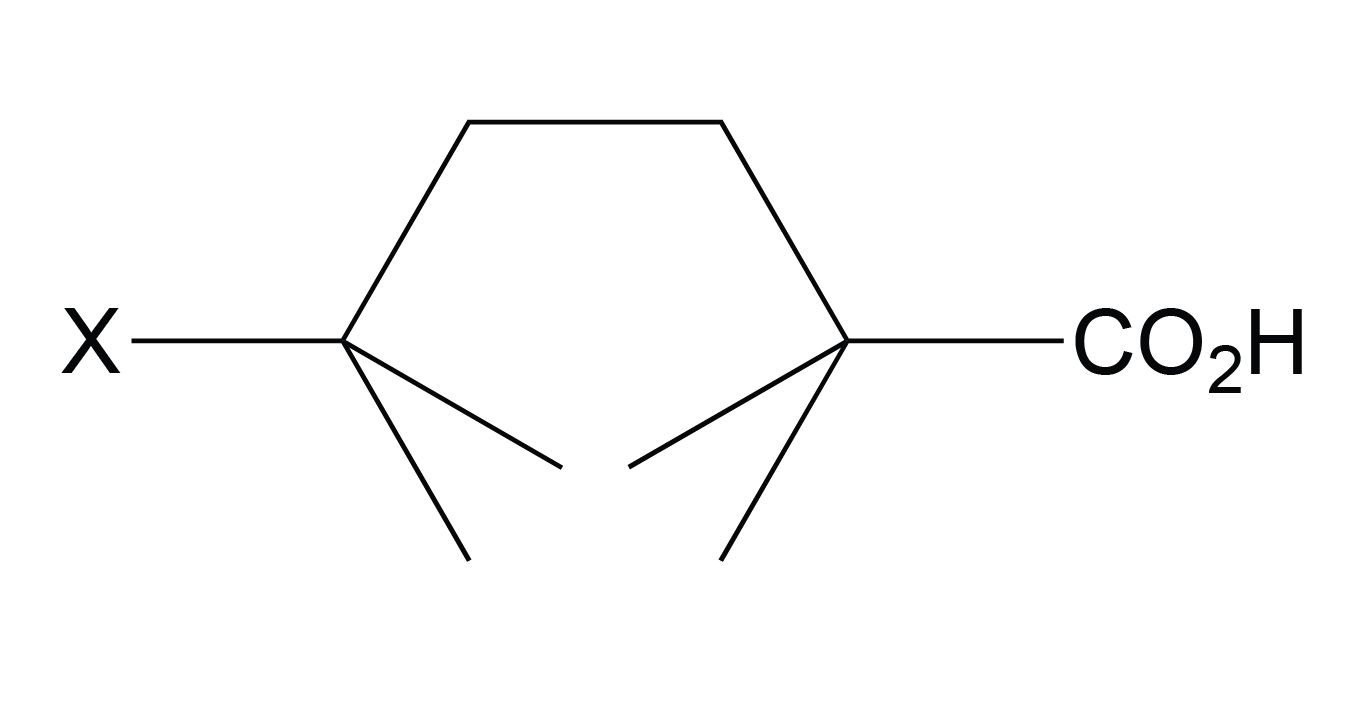
This octane derivative has only a single linker between the electron-withdrawing substituent and the acidic group.

Localized electronic effects are a combination of inductive and field effects. Due to the similarity in these effects, it is difficult to separate their contributions to the electronic structure of a molecule. There is, however, a large body of literature devoted to developing an understanding of the relative significance of induction and field effects by analyzing related compounds in an attempt to quantify each effect based on the present substituents and molecular geometry. For example, the three compounds to the right, all octanes, differ only in the number of linkers between the electron withdrawing group X and an acidic functional group, which are approximately the same spatial distance apart in each compound. It is known that an electron-withdrawing substituent will decrease the pKa of a given proton (i.e. increase the acidity) inductively. If induction was the dominant effect in these compounds, acidity should increase linearly with the number of available inductive pathways (linkers). However, the experimental data shows that effect on acidity in related octanes and cubanes is very similar, and therefore the dominant effect must be through space.

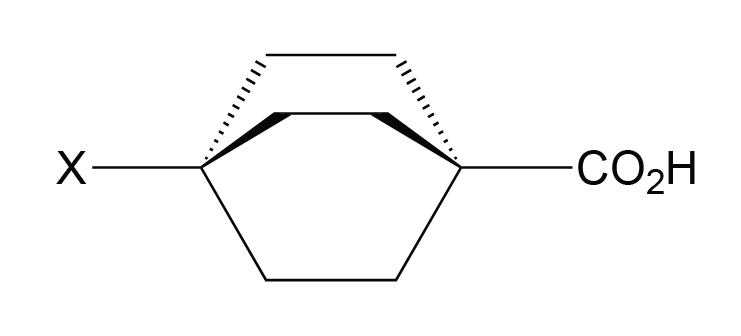
This octane derivative has two linkers between the electron-withdrawing substituent and the acidic group.

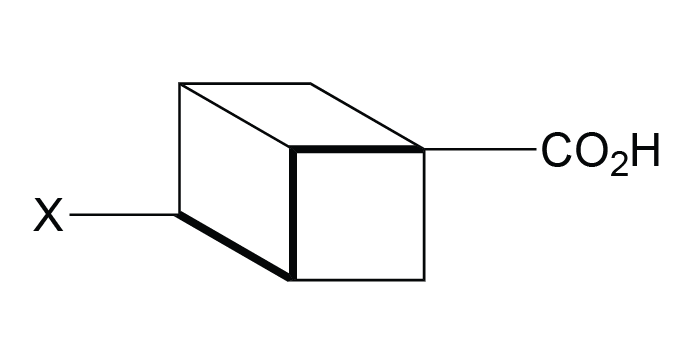
This cubane derivative has four linkers but the acidic proton still feels the same effect from the C-X dipole because the interaction is a field effect.

In the cis-11,12-dichloro-9,10-dihydro-9,10-ethano-2-anthroic acid syn and anti isomers, the chlorine atoms provide a field effect. The concentration of negative charge on each chlorine has a through space effect which can be seen in the relative pKa values. When the chlorine atoms are pointed over the carboxylic acid group, the pKa is higher because loss of a proton is less favorable due to the increase in negative charge in the area. Loss of a proton results in a negative charge which is less stable if there is already an inherent concentration of electrons. This can be attributed to a field effect because in the same compound with the chlorines pointed away from the acidic group the pKa is lower, and if the effect were inductive the conformational position would not matter.
