= 7-Methyl-1,5,7-triazabicyclo(4.4.0)dec-5-ene =

7-Methyl-1,5,7-triazabicyclo[4.4.0]dec-5-ene

Names
- Preferred IUPAC name 1-Methyl-2,3,4,6,7,8-hexahydro-1H-pyrimido[1,2-a]pyrimidine
- Other names mTBD; 7-Methyl-TBD; 7-Methyl-1,5,7-triazabicyclo[4.4.0]dec-5-ene; 1,3,4,6,7,8-Hexahydro-1-methyl-2H-pyrimido[1,2-a]pyrimidine

Identifiers
CAS Number	84030-20-6
3D model (JSmol)	Interactive image
ChemSpider	110177
ECHA InfoCard	100.074.332
EC Number	281-791-1
PubChem CID	123583
UNII	S8JQ539BWX
CompTox Dashboard (EPA)	DTXSID70232932
- InChI: InChI=1S/C8H15N3/c1-10-5-3-7-11-6-2-4-9-8(10)11/h2-7H2,1H3 Key: OEBXWWBYZJNKRK-UHFFFAOYSA-N
- SMILES: CN1CCCN2C1=NCCC2

Properties
Chemical formula	C_{8}H_{15}N_{3}
Molar mass	153.225 g/mol
Appearance	clear liquid
Density	1063.35 kg/m^{3}
Melting point	17 °C (63 °F; 290 K)
Boiling point	263 °C (505 °F; 536 K)
Thermal conductivity	0.144 W/m/K
Refractive index (n_{D})	1.5357
Viscosity	7.1 cP

Hazards
- GHS labelling
Pictograms	(GHS05: Corrosive)
Signal word	Danger
Hazard statements	H314
Precautionary statements	P260, P264, P280, P301+P330+P331, P303+P361+P353, P304+P340, P305+P351+P338, P310, P321, P363, P405, P501

Thermochemistry
Heat capacity (C)	1.75 J/g/K
- Except where otherwise noted, data are given for materials in their standard state (at 25 °C [77 °F], 100 kPa). (what is ?) Infobox references

7-Methyl-1,5,7-triazabicyclo[4.4.0]dec-5-ene (mTBD) is a bicyclic strong guanidine base (pK_{a} = 25.43 in CH_{3}CN and pK_{a} = 17.9 in THF). mTBD, like 1,5,7-triazabicyclo[4.4.0]dec-5-ene and other guanidine super bases, can be used as a catalyst in a variety of chemical reactions. It also reacts with CO_{2}, which could make it useful for carbon capture and storage.

When brought into contact with some acids, mTBD reacts to form an ionic liquid. Some of these ionic liquids can dissolve cellulose.
