= Alkylammonium =

In organic chemistry, alkylammonium refers to cations of the formula [R_{4−n}NH_{n}]^{+}, where R = alkyl and 1≤ n ≤ 4. The cations with four alkyl substituents, i.e., [R_{4}N]^{+}, are further classified as quaternary ammonium cations and are discussed more thoroughly in the article with that title. In contrast to quaternary ammonium cations, other members of the alkylammonium cations do not exist appreciably in the presence of strong base because they undergo deprotonation, yielding the parent amine. The alkylammonium cations containing N-H centers are colorless and often hydrophilic.

== Occurrence ==
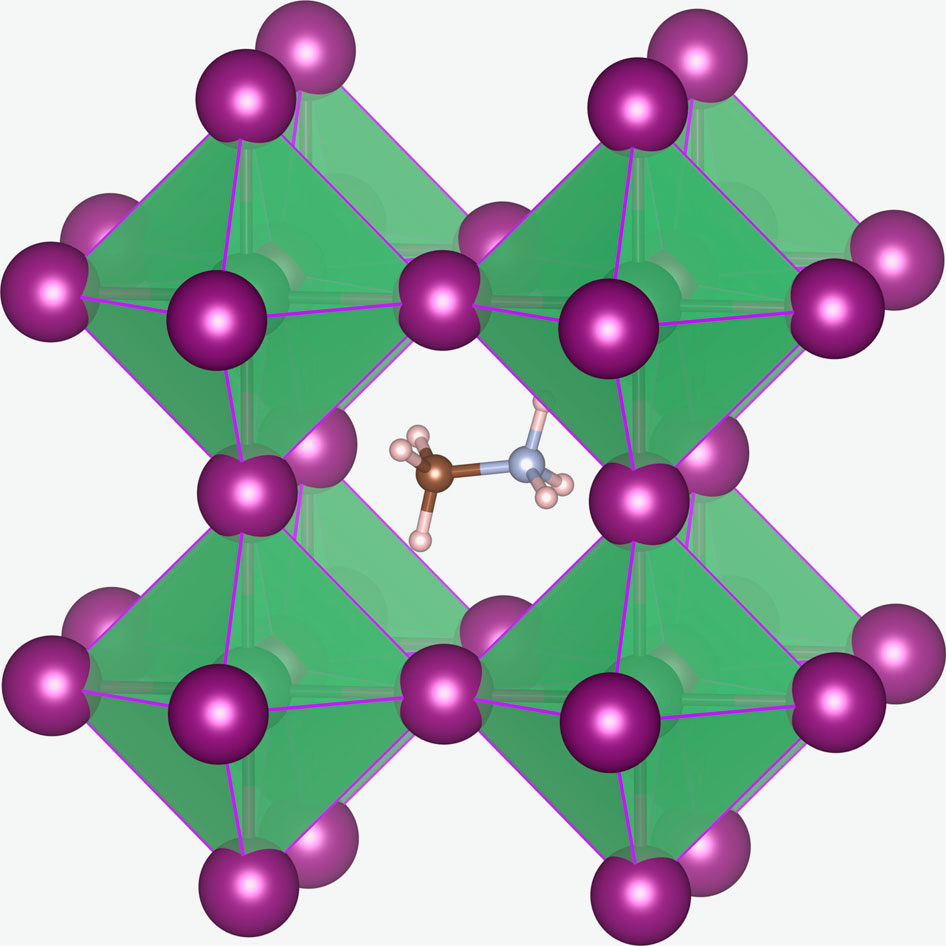
Crystal structure of CH_{3}NH_{3}PbI_{3}. The methylammonium cation (CH_{3}NH_{3}^{+}) is surrounded by PbI_{6} octahedra, the basis of perovskite solar cells.

Alkylammonium species are pervasive since virtually all alkyl amines protonate near neutral pH.

Examples of technologically significant alkylammonium compounds are:

- Ethylenediamine dihydroiodide is used as a source of iodide in animal feed.
- dimethylammonium and diethylammonium, which are generated in the production of dimethyldithiocarbamate and diethyldithiocarbamate:

2 R_{2}NH + CS_{2} → [R_{2}NH_{2}^{+}][R_{2}NCS_{2}^{−}]
