= Electron-rich =

General term in chemistry

Electron-rich is jargon that is used in multiple related meanings with either or both kinetic and thermodynamic implications:

- with regard to electron-transfer, electron-rich species have low ionization energy and/or are reducing agents. Tetrakis(dimethylamino)ethylene is an electron-rich alkene because, unlike ethylene, it forms isolable radical cation. In contrast, electron-poor alkene tetracyanoethylene is an electron acceptor, forming isolable anions.
- with regard to acid-base reactions, electron-rich species have high pKa's and react with weak Lewis acids.
- with regard to nucleophilic substitution reactions, electron-rich species are relatively strong nucleophiles, as judged by rates of attack by electrophiles. For example, compared to benzene, pyrrole is more rapidly attacked by electrophiles. Pyrrole is therefore considered to be an electron-rich aromatic ring. Similarly, benzene derivatives with electron-donating groups (EDGs) are attacked by electrophiles faster than in benzene. The electron-donating vs electron-withdrawing influence of various functional groups have been extensively parameterized in linear free energy relationships.
- with regard to Lewis acidity, electron-rich species are strong Lewis bases.

== See also ==
- Electron-withdrawing group
