= Formal charge =

Hypothetical charge assigned to an atom in a molecule based on its valence shell

Formal charges in ozone and the nitrate anion

In chemistry, a formal charge (F.C. or q*), in the covalent view of chemical bonding, is the hypothetical charge assigned to an atom in a molecule, assuming that electrons in all chemical bonds are shared equally between atoms, regardless of relative electronegativity. In simple terms, formal charge is the difference between the number of valence electrons of an atom in a neutral free state and the number assigned to that atom in a Lewis structure. When determining the best Lewis structure (or predominant resonance structure) for a molecule, the structure is chosen such that the formal charge on each of the atoms is as close to zero as possible.

The formal charge of any atom in a molecule can be calculated by the following equation:
$$q^{*} = V - L - \frac{B}{2}$$

where V is the number of valence electrons of the neutral atom in isolation (in its ground state); L is the number of non-bonding valence electrons assigned to this atom in the Lewis structure of the molecule; and B is the total number of electrons shared in bonds with other atoms in the molecule. It can also be found visually as shown below.

Formal charge and oxidation state both assign a number to each individual atom within a compound; they are compared and contrasted in a section below.

== Examples ==
- Example: CO_{2} is a neutral molecule with 16 total valence electrons. There are different ways to draw the Lewis structure
  - Carbon single bonded to both oxygen atoms (carbon = +2, oxygens = −1 each, total formal charge = 0)
  - Carbon single bonded to one oxygen and double bonded to another (carbon = +1, oxygen_{double} = 0, oxygen_{single} = −1, total formal charge = 0)
  - Carbon double bonded to both oxygen atoms (carbon = 0, oxygens = 0, total formal charge = 0)

Even though all three structures gave us a total charge of zero, the final structure is the superior one because there are no charges in the molecule at all.

=== Pictorial method ===
The following is equivalent:

- Draw a circle around the atom for which the formal charge is requested (as with carbon dioxide, below)

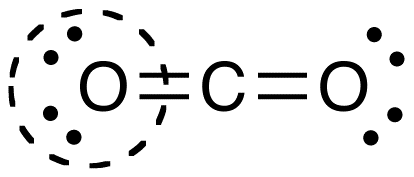

- Count up the number of electrons in the atom's "circle." Since the circle cuts the covalent bond "in half," each covalent bond counts as one electron instead of two.
- Subtract the number of electrons in the circle from the number of valence electrons of the neutral atom in isolation (in its ground state) to determine the formal charge.

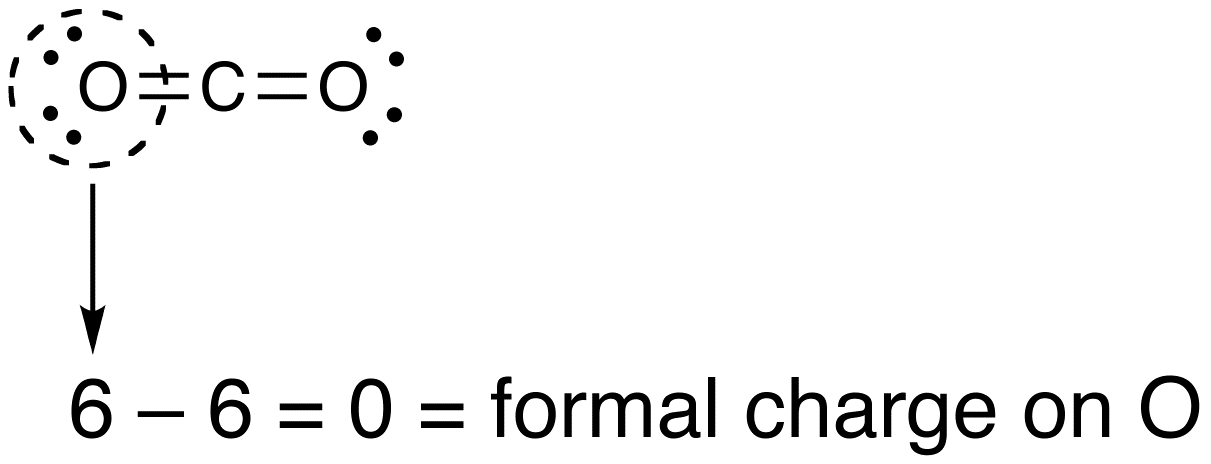

- The formal charges computed for the remaining atoms in this Lewis structure of carbon dioxide are shown below.

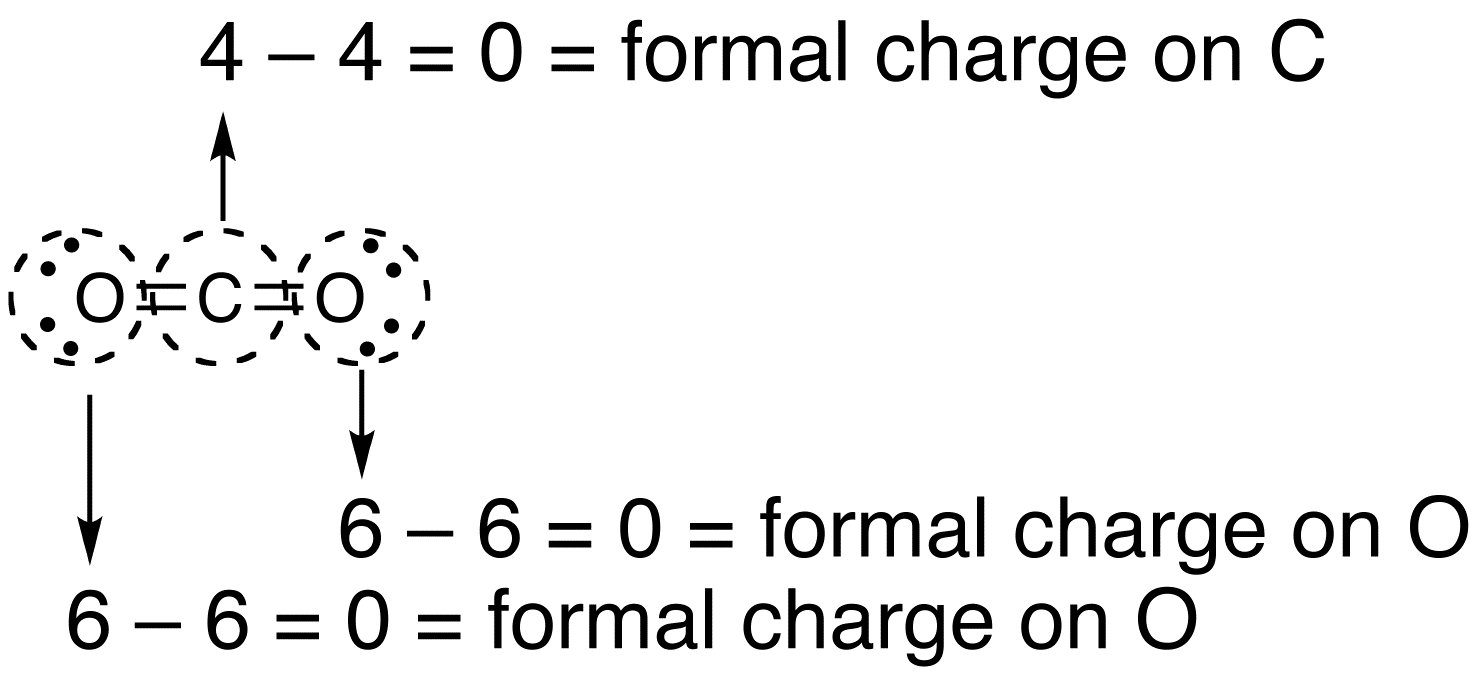

It is important to keep in mind that formal charges are just that – formal, in the sense that this system is a formalism. The formal charge system is just a method to keep track of all of the valence electrons that each atom brings with it when the molecule is formed.

== Usage conventions ==
In organic chemistry convention, formal charges are an essential feature of a correctly rendered Lewis–Kekulé structure, and a structure omitting nonzero formal charges is considered incorrect, or at least, incomplete. Formal charges are drawn in close proximity to the atom bearing the charge. They may or may not be enclosed in a circle for clarity.

In contrast, this convention is not followed in inorganic chemistry. Many workers in organometallic and a majority of workers in coordination chemistry will omit formal charges, unless they are needed for emphasis, or they are needed to make a particular point. Instead a top-right corner ⌝ will be drawn following the covalently-bound, charged entity, in turn followed immediately by the overall charge.

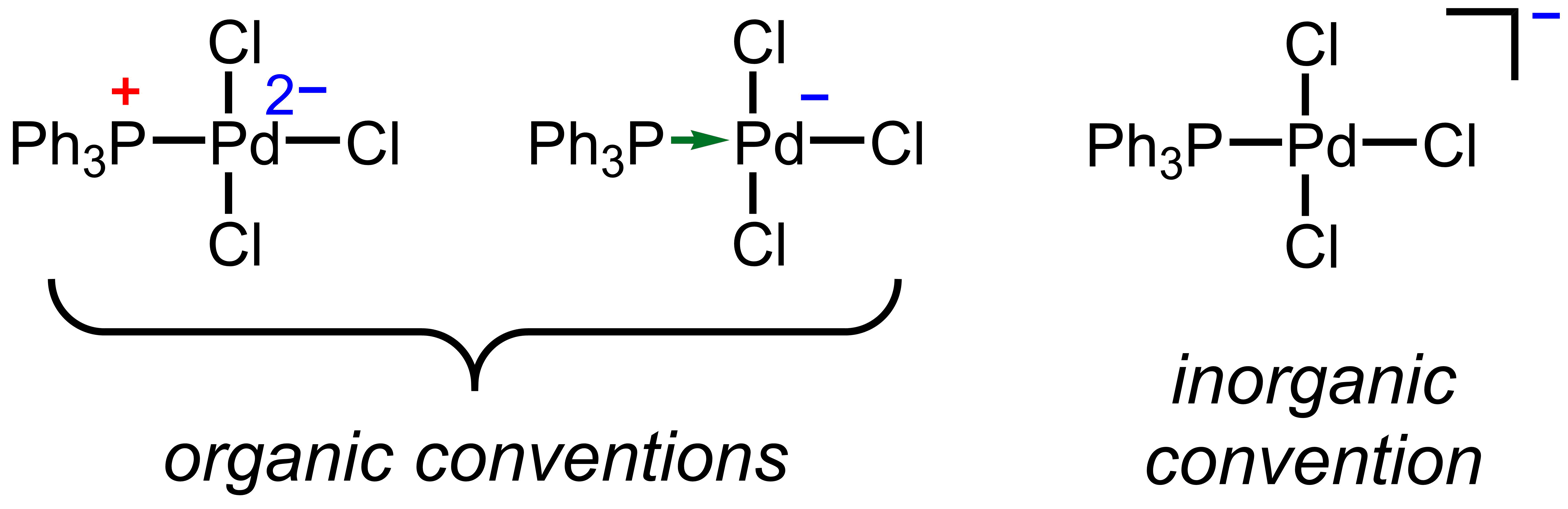
Three different depictions of the charges on trichloro(triphenylphosphine)palladium(1-). The first two follow the "organic" convention, by showing formal charges. In the first structure on the left, it is implied that palladium has two valence electrons (V = 2), zero lone pairs (L = 0), and eight bonding electrons (B = 8), giving a formal charge of -2 for palladium (q* = 2 - 0 - 8/2 = -2). In the second structure, the L-type ligand is depicted with a coordinate or "dative" bond to avoid additional formal charges. The dative bond in the second structure reduces the number of bonding electrons (B) by 2 for both the phosphorus and the palladium. The third structure, on the other hand, follows the "inorganic" convention, and only the total charge is given. (Note that this is arguably not an organic compound or even an organometallic compound, because the palladium is not directly bound to any carbons.)

The top-right corner ⌝ is sometimes replaced by square brackets enclosing the entire charged species, again with the total charge written in the upper right corner, just outside the brackets.

This difference in practice stems from the relatively straightforward assignment of bond order, valence electron count, and hence, formal charge for compounds only containing main-group elements (though oligomeric compounds like organolithium reagents and enolates tend to be depicted in an oversimplified and idealized manner), but transition metals have an unclear number of valence electrons so there is no unambiguous way to assign formal charges.

== Formal charge compared to oxidation state ==
The formal charge is a tool for estimating the distribution of electric charge within a molecule. The concept of oxidation states constitutes a competing method to assess the distribution of electrons in molecules. If the formal charges and oxidation states of the atoms in carbon dioxide are compared, the following values are arrived at:

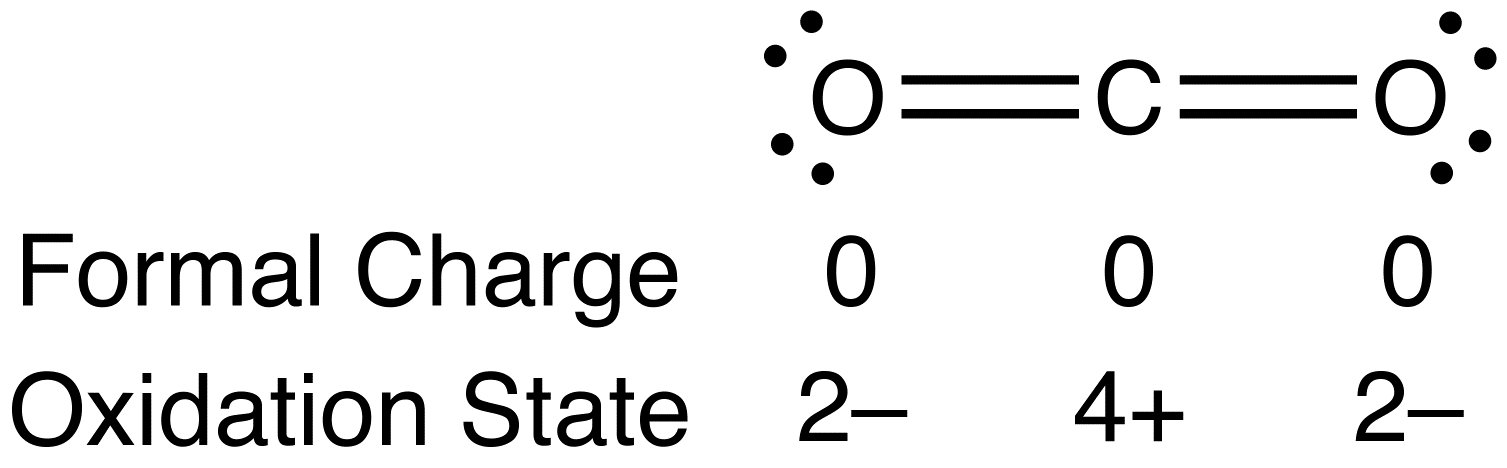

The reason for the difference between these values is that formal charges and oxidation states represent fundamentally different ways of looking at the distribution of electrons amongst the atoms in the molecule. With the formal charge, the electrons in each covalent bond are assumed to be split exactly evenly between the two atoms in the bond (hence the dividing by two in the method described above). The formal charge view of the CO_{2} molecule is essentially shown below:

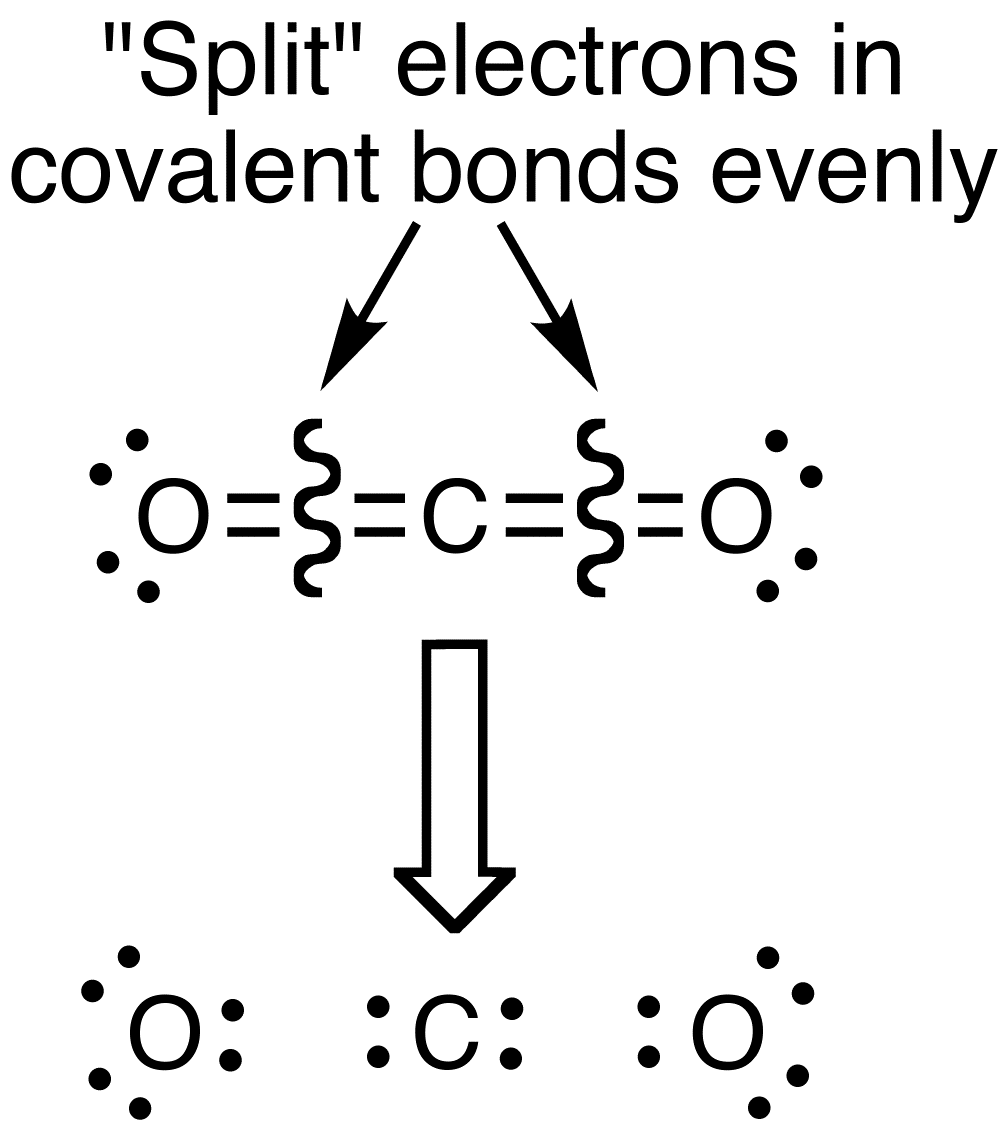

The covalent (sharing) aspect of the bonding is overemphasized in the use of formal charges since in reality there is a higher electron density around the oxygen atoms due to their higher electronegativity compared to the carbon atom. This can be most effectively visualized in an electrostatic potential map.

With the oxidation state formalism, the electrons in the bonds are "awarded" to the atom with the greater electronegativity. The oxidation state view of the CO_{2} molecule is shown below:

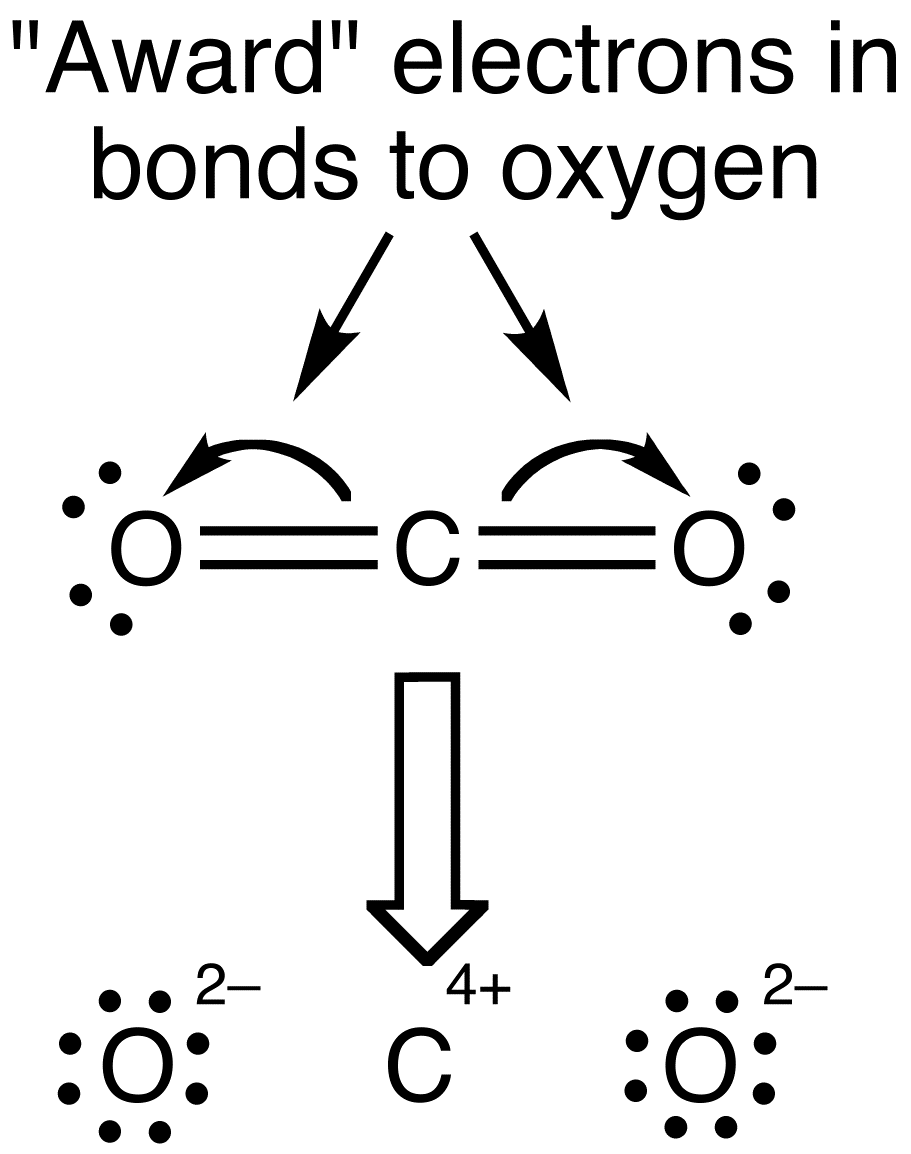

Oxidation states overemphasize the ionic nature of the bonding; the difference in electronegativity between carbon and oxygen is insufficient to regard the bonds as being ionic in nature.

In reality, the distribution of electrons in the molecule lies somewhere between these two extremes. The inadequacy of the simple Lewis structure view of molecules led to the development of the more generally applicable and accurate valence bond theory of Slater, Pauling, et al., and henceforth the molecular orbital theory developed by Mulliken and Hund.

== See also ==
- Oxidation state
- Valence (chemistry)
- Coordination number
