= MIT Department of Chemistry =

The Department of Chemistry at MIT was established in 1865. Research conducted covers the entire field of chemistry, ranging from organic chemistry and biological chemistry to physical chemistry, inorganic chemistry, environmental chemistry, materials science, and nanoscience.

== History ==
The Department of Chemistry at MIT has been established since the Institute opened its doors in 1865. It started with two professors, Charles W. Eliot and Francis H. Storer, and a class of 15 students.

In 1866, the department moved to its then new quarters in the basement of the Rogers Building in Boston.

In 1907, MIT awarded its first Ph.D. to three students in the field of physical chemistry.

== Nobel laureates ==
The department has several Nobel Laureates among its faculty and alumni, including the following:

- Robert B. Woodward (Chemistry, 1965)
- Robert S. Mulliken (Chemistry, 1966)
- H. Gobind Khorana (Medicine & Physiology, 1968)
- Geoffrey Wilkinson (Chemistry, 1973)
- Charles J. Pedersen (Chemistry 1987)
- Sidney Altman and Thomas R. Cech (Chemistry, 1989)
- Elias J. Corey (Chemistry, 1990)
- Mario Molina (Chemistry, 1995)
- K. Barry Sharpless (Chemistry, 2001)
- Aaron Ciechanover (Chemistry, 2004)
- Richard R. Schrock (Chemistry, 2005)
- Moungi Bawendi (Chemistry, 2023)

== Faculty ==
=== Current members ===
- Moungi Bawendi
- Stephen L. Buchwald
- Jianshu Cao
- Sylvia Ceyer
- Arup K. Chakraborty
- Christopher C. Cummins, Ph.D. 1993
- Rick L. Danheiser
- John M. Deutch, S.B. 1961, Ph.D. 1966
- Catherine L. Drennan
- John M. Essigmann, S.M. 1972, Ph.D. 1976
- Robert W. Field
- Frederick D. Greene
- Robert G. Griffin
- Mei Hong
- Barbara Imperiali
- Timothy F. Jamison
- Jeremiah A. Johnson
- Laura L. Kiessling, S.B. 1983
- Alexander M. Klibanov
- Stephen J. Lippard, Ph.D. 1965
- Mohammad Movassaghi
- Keith A. Nelson
- Elizabeth Nolan, Ph.D. 2006
- Brad L. Pentelute
- Alexander T. Radosevich
- Ronald T. Raines, S.B. 1980
- Gabriela Schlau-Cohen
- Richard R. Schrock
- Dietmar Seyferth
- Alex K. Shalek
- Matthew D. Shoulders
- Susan Solomon
- Jeffrey I. Steinfeld, S.B. 1962
- JoAnne Stubbe
- Daniel L. M. Suess
- Yogesh Surendranath, Ph.D. 2011
- Timothy M. Swager
- Steven R. Tannenbaum, S.B. 1958, Ph.D. 1962
- Troy Van Voorhis
- Xiao Wang
- Alison Wendlandt
- Adam P. Willard
- Bin Zhang

=== Former members ===
* Robert A. Alberty
- Isadore Amdur
- Avery Ashdown
- James A. Beattie
- Klaus Biemann
- Arthur A. Blanchard
- George H. Büchi
- James Mason Crafts
- Alan Davison
- Mircea Dincă
- Charles W. Eliot
- Gregory Fu
- Carl W. Garland
- Leicester F. Hamilton
- Daniel S. Kemp
- Frederick G. Keyes
- H. Gobind Khorana
- Gilbert Newton Lewis
- Mario Molina
- Forris Jewitt Moore
- Avery A. Morton
- Lewis M. Morton
- Samuel Parsons Mulliken
- Daniel G. Nocera
- James Flack Norris
- Arthur Amos Noyes, S.B. 1886
- Irwin Oppenheim
- Jonas C. Peters
- Joseph Sadighi
- Walter C. Schumb
- George Scatchard
- Peter Seeberger
- K. Barry Sharpless
- John C. Sheehan
- Robert J. Silbey
- Walter H. Stockmayer
- Francis H. Storer
- Henry P. Talbot
- Andrei Tokmakoff
- William Walker
- Christopher T. Walsh
- Cyrus Warren
- John S. Waugh
- Mark S. Wrighton
- Douglas Youvan
- Hans-Conrad zur Loye

== Notable alumni ==
- Sidney Altman, S.B. 1960
- Elias J. Corey, S.B. 1948, Ph.D. 1951
- Roscoe G. Dickinson
- Robert S. Mulliken, S.B. 1917
- Charles J. Pedersen, S.M. 1927
- Ellen Swallow Richards, S.B. 1873
- Robert B. Woodward, S.B. 1936, Ph.D. 1937
