= Guru Rao =

American biochemist

A. Gururaj Rao is an Indian-American biochemist.

A. Gururaj Rao (also known as Guru Rao and Aragula Rao) has over 40 years of research experience in biochemistry/molecular biology, and leadership experience in research administration in academia and the private sector.

Education

Rao obtained his Ph.D. doctorate in Biochemistry from the University of Mysore in 1981, while completing a Postdoctoral Fellowship at Case Western University between 1980 to 1983. Thereafter, he began his academic career on the University of South Carolina faculty as a research assistant professor from 1983 to 1987.

In 1988, Rao shifted from academia into the world of corporate research. He joined Des Moines based Pioneer Hi-Bred International (now Corteva) as a protein biochemist in the biotechnology division where he engaged in techniques in protein engineering for improving the nutritional value and disease resistance in crop plants such as corn and soybean. He subsequently joined the Iowa State University faculty, where he later served as chair of the Roy J. Carver Department of Biochemistry, Biophysics and Molecular Biology. Rao was also associate vice president for research during his tenure at Iowa State. In 2020, Rao served as interim vice president for research between the retirement of Sarah Nusser to the appointment of Peter K. Dorhout. Upon retiring from Iowa State, Rao was granted emeritus status.

Rao was elected a fellow of the American Association for the Advancement of Science in 2016, and awarded an equivalent honor from the National Academy of Inventors in 2019. In 2023 Rao was included in Marquis Who's Who. He has numerous patents and peer-reviewed publications and served as associate editor for the journals, PLOS ONE and Journal of Proteins and Proteomics (India). Rao pursues an avid interest in science communication and fostering research-based innovation and entrepreneurship strategies in the academic community.
