= Peter K. Dorhout =

American chemist and professor

Peter Kenneth Dorhout
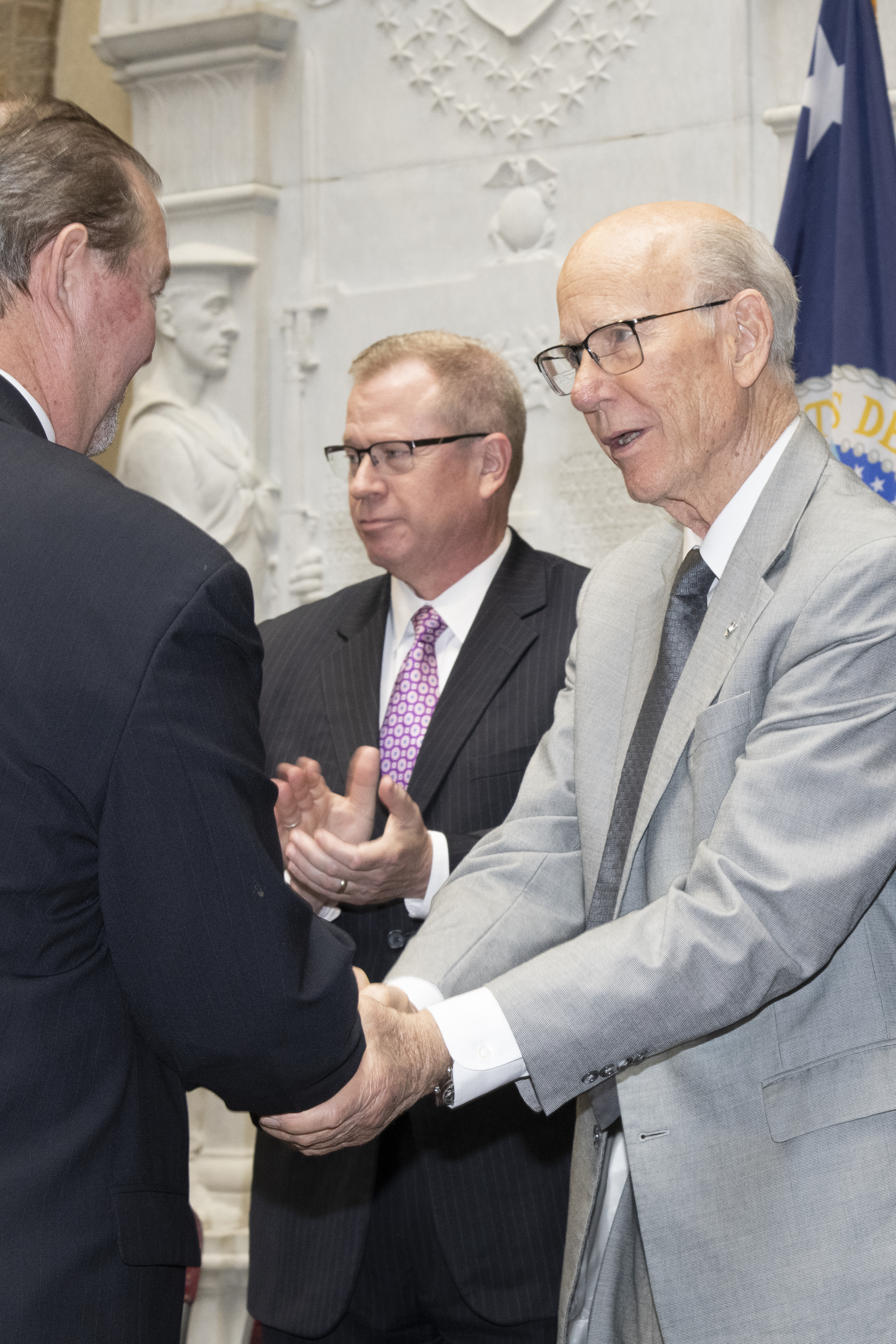
- Dorhout (c)

Vice President of Research at Iowa State University
- Incumbent
- Assumed office 2021
- Preceded by: Guru Rao (interim); Sarah Nusser

Vice President of Research at Kansas State University
- In office 2016–2021
- Appointed by: Kirk Schulz

President of the American Chemical Society
- In office 2018–2018

Personal details
- Education: University of Illinois Urbana–Champaign; University of Wisconsin–Madison

Peter Kenneth Dorhout is an American professor of chemistry and the vice president for research at Iowa State University. He was the 2018 President of the American Chemical Society (ACS). As an advocate for science, he has had the opportunity to talk to United States congressional staff about the importance of basic science funding through the National Science Foundation.

== Education and career ==
Dorhout earned his Bachelor of Science degree in chemistry at the University of Illinois Urbana–Champaign, followed by a Ph.D. in chemistry from the University of Wisconsin–Madison under the direction of Arthur B. Ellis. Afterwards, he was a postdoctoral fellow at the Iowa State University Ames Laboratory.

He joined the Colorado State University (CSU) as an assistant professor of chemistry in 1991 and became a full professor in 2002, the same year he became the associate dean for research and graduate education for the college of natural sciences. As associate dean, he was involved in the creation of the Undergraduate Research Institute. In 2004, he moved to the provost's office to become the interim vice provost for graduate studies and assistant vice president for research. He was appointed to both positions on a permanent basis in 2005. As vice provost, he played a key role in establishing the Colorado School of Public Health, a collaboration between CSU, the University of Northern Colorado and the University of Colorado, which opened in 2008. Dorhout was also involved in the creation of six new master's programs as well as four doctoral programs and was involved in the university's initiatives and partnerships in Asian countries, particularly China and India.

Dorhout's research interests include thin film materials, solid-state and environmental chemistry, as well as actinide and radiochemistry. His projects have spanned areas such as heavy metal detection and remediation, nuclear nonproliferation and ferroelectric nanomaterials. He is the author of over 110 peer-reviewed articles, book chapters and edited books.

In 2011, Dorhout accepted a temporary appointment as provost at the Colorado State University–Pueblo.

In January 2012, Dorhout became the dean of college of arts and sciences at Kansas State University. In 2016, then President Kirk Schulz appointed him vice president for research after a nationwide search. Since 2021, Dorhout has served as the vice president for research at Iowa State University. He was appointed to a second term in the role in 2024.

Dorhout served as president of the American Chemical Society in 2018.

== Awards and honors ==
- American Association for the Advancement of Science (AAAS) Fellow (2017)
- American Chemical Society Fellow (2013)
- Oliver P. Pennock Service award (2011)
