= Jacqueline Barton =

American chemist (born 1952)

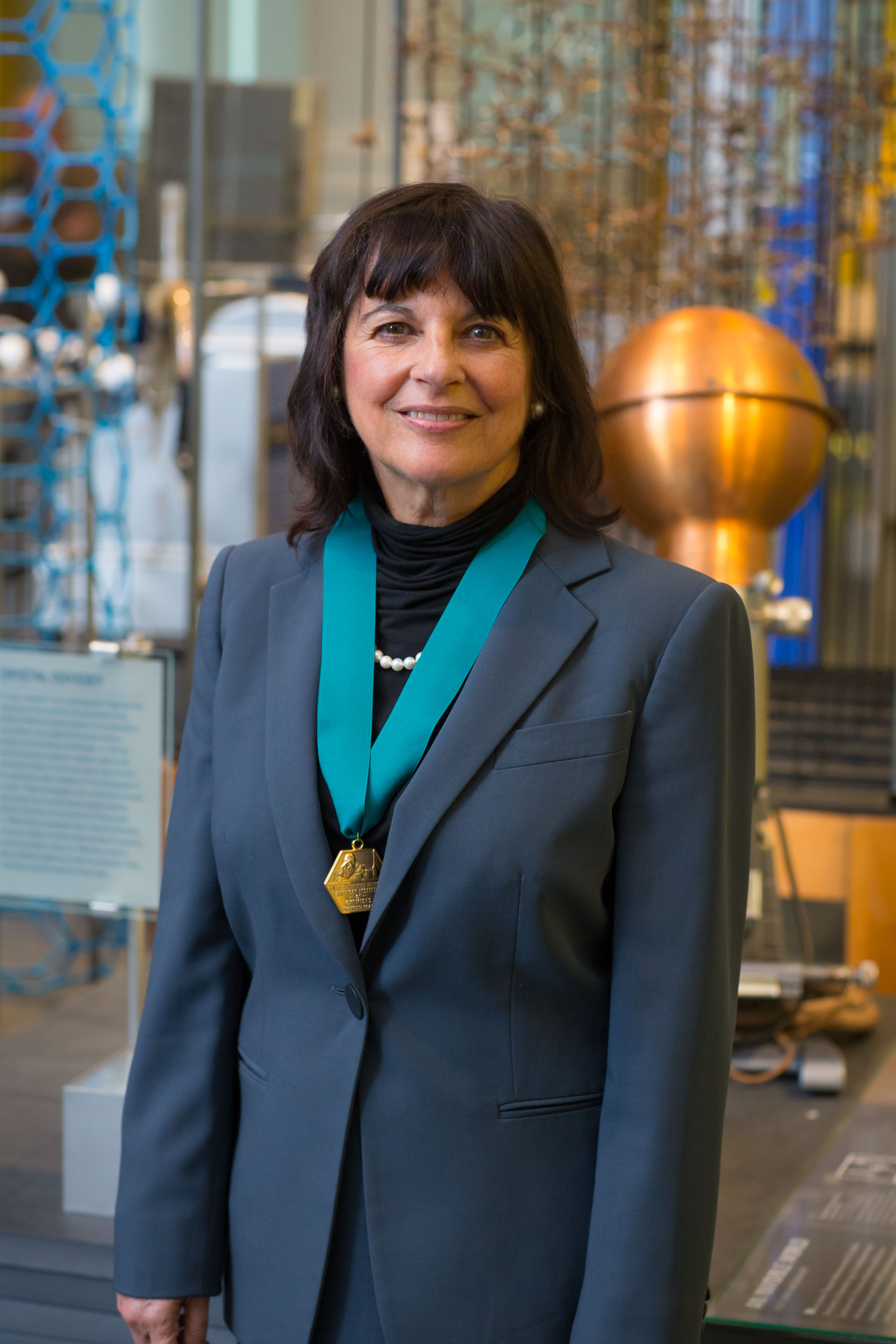
- Jacqueline Barton, AIC Gold Medal, 2015
- Born: Jacqueline Ann Kapelman; May 7, 1952 (age 74); New York City
- Education: Barnard College; Columbia University
- Spouses: Donald J. Barton (m. 1973); Peter Dervan (m. 1990)
- Awards: NSF Waterman Award (1985); ACS Award in Pure Chemistry (1988); MacArthur Foundation fellow (1991); Garvan–Olin Medal (1992); William H. Nichols Medal (1997); Weizmann Women & Science Award (1998); ACS Gibbs Medal (2006); Linus Pauling Award (2007); National Medal of Science (2011); AIC Gold Medal (2015); Priestley Medal (2015); Centenary Prize (2018) Welch Award (2023)
- Scientific career
- Fields: Chemistry
- Workplaces: Bell Labs; Yale University; Hunter College; Columbia University; California Institute of Technology
- Thesis: The structure and chemical reactivity of a blue platinum complex: The interaction of antitumor platinum drugs and a metallointercalation reagent with nucleic acids (1979)
- Doctoral advisor: Stephen J. Lippard
- Other academic advisors: Robert G. Shulman (post doctoral advisor)
- Doctoral students: Michelle R. Arkin; Christine S. Chow; Sarah Delaney; Duncan Odom; Shana O. Kelley; Anna Marie Pyle
- Other notable students: MS students: Michael Purugganan; Post-docs: Catherine J. Murphy
- Website: www.its.caltech.edu/~jkbgrp/BartonBiography.htm

Jacqueline K. Barton (born May 7, 1952 New York City, NY), is an American chemist. She worked as a professor of chemistry at Hunter College (1980–82), and at Columbia University (1983–89) before joining the California Institute of Technology. In 1997 she became the Arthur and Marian Hanisch Memorial Professor of Chemistry and from 2009 to 2019, the Norman Davidson Leadership Chair of the Division of Chemistry and Chemical Engineering at Caltech. She currently is the John G. Kirkwood and Arthur A. Noyes Professor of Chemistry, Emerita.

Barton studies the chemical and physical properties of DNA and their roles in biological activities. The primary focus of her research is transverse electron transport along double-stranded DNA, its implications in the biology of DNA damage and repair, and its potential for materials sciences applications such as targeted chemotherapeutic treatments for cancer. Among many other awards, Barton has received the 2011 National Medal of Science and the 2015 Priestley Medal.

== Early life and education ==
Jacqueline Ann Kapelman was born on May 7, 1952, in New York City. Her father served in the Assembly for nearly a decade before serving as a trial judge in the New York Supreme Court next two decades. Her father was one of the trial judges in the Son of Sam serial murder case.

Jacqueline Kapelman attended Riverdale Country School for Girls in Riverdale, New York, where her math teacher, Mrs. Rosenberg, insisted that she be allowed to take calculus at the boys' school. Her interest in chemistry began at Barnard College, where she studied physical chemistry with Bernice Segal. She loved laboratory work and chemical transformations and found Segal an inspiration as a teacher. During her last year at Barnard she married first year medical student Donald J. Barton, receiving her B.A. from Barnard College as Jacqueline Kapelman Barton, summa cum laude, in 1974.

She then studied inorganic chemistry at Columbia University under the supervision of Stephen J. Lippard. While at Columbia she began studying transition-metal complexes and their possible applications to chemotherapy. She earned a PhD in Inorganic Chemistry in 1979, addressing The structure and chemical reactivity of a blue platinum complex: the interaction of antitumor platinum drugs and metallointercalation reagent with nucleic acids.

== Career and research ==
External media

Audio
- "Nature uses this for long-range signalling and finding mistakes in DNA", Jacqueline Barton: DNA like wire for signaling within a cell, EarthSky & Chemical Heritage Foundation

Video
- "Science is the most fun in the whole wide world", Medal of Science 50 Videos – Peter Dervan and Jacqueline Barton, National Science Foundation

After earning her Ph.D. from Columbia in 1979, Barton held post-doctoral appointments at Bell Labs and Yale University, where she worked with Robert G. Shulman. She used nuclear magnetic resonance imaging technology to examine the metabolism of yeast cells. Barton became a professor of chemistry at Hunter College from 1980 to 1982, and began to develop her own laboratory, the Barton Research Group. While at Hunter, she studied the interactions of zinc ions with DNA, and later the interactions of ruthenium(II) and cobalt(III) complexes with DNA. This enabled her to roughly model complexes on a DNA helix and to begin studying the photophysical and photochemical properties related to enantiomers.

In the 1980s, she moved to Columbia University where she taught from 1983 to 1989. She became a full professor in 1986 and was the first woman to receive tenure in the chemistry department at Columbia. Her research focused on the use of organo-ruthenium complexes to examine the physical structure of DNA. With Nicholas Turro and Vijay Kumar she studied the interactions of ruthenium phenanthroline complexes and DNA and was able to design binding molecules targeted to specific DNA sequences. Photosensitive ruthenium complexes would glow brightly when they attached to the DNA double helix. When rhodium complexes were attached to the DNA, they would attract the electron causing the glow, and "turn off" the effect. During her time at Columbia, Barton obtained two patents for this method of analyzing DNA structure.

In 1989, Barton moved to Caltech, where her research has focused on charge transport in DNA. By using specially designed chiral metal complexes as probes of DNA she has been able to study how DNA is damaged and repaired. In DNA-based diagnostic tests, complexes are used to determine whether electrons can flow across the DNA. If an electron could not move along the DNA, the DNA would continue to glow, indicating that there was damage in the DNA genetic molecule.

The research that Barton, Catherine J. Murphy, Megan Núñez and others have done at Caltech has supported the idea of fast long-range electron transfer over DNA, challenging accepted scientific views and causing considerable controversy. Based on years of studies, Barton and her group theorize that DNA operates like a wire, supporting a type of long-range signaling that enables repair proteins to detect and correct mistakes in DNA. This view of DNA is deeper and more dynamic than previous views of DNA as a static library.

Understanding the mediation of electron-transfer chemistry by the DNA double helix has laid a foundation for the development of new diagnostic tools and for the possible design of novel chemotherapeutics. Barton, Erik Holmlin, Shana Kelley, and Mike Hill created the company GeneOhm Sciences to explore the development of sensitive diagnostics for detecting DNA mismatches. The company has since been acquired by BD Diagnostics.

Barton has taught more than 100 graduate and postdoctoral students, many of whom are women. Recognized as a "superb role model, not just for young women but for all young scientists", Barton advises others that "the best thing that I can do for women in science is first to do good science". She became the Arthur and Marian Hanisch Memorial Professor of Chemistry in 1997. She was named chair of the Division of Chemistry and Chemical Engineering of California Institute of Technology, effective July 1, 2009.

Barton was a Member of the Board of Directors of Dow Chemical for more than twenty years. She has also served on the Gilead Sciences Scientific Advisory Board (1989–2008) and has been a member of Gilead's Board of Directors since 2018.

In 1990, she married Peter Dervan, a fellow chemist and professor at Caltech, who is also a National Medal of Science winner. She has two children, a daughter, Elizabeth (born in 1991), and a stepson Andrew.

=== Research summary ===
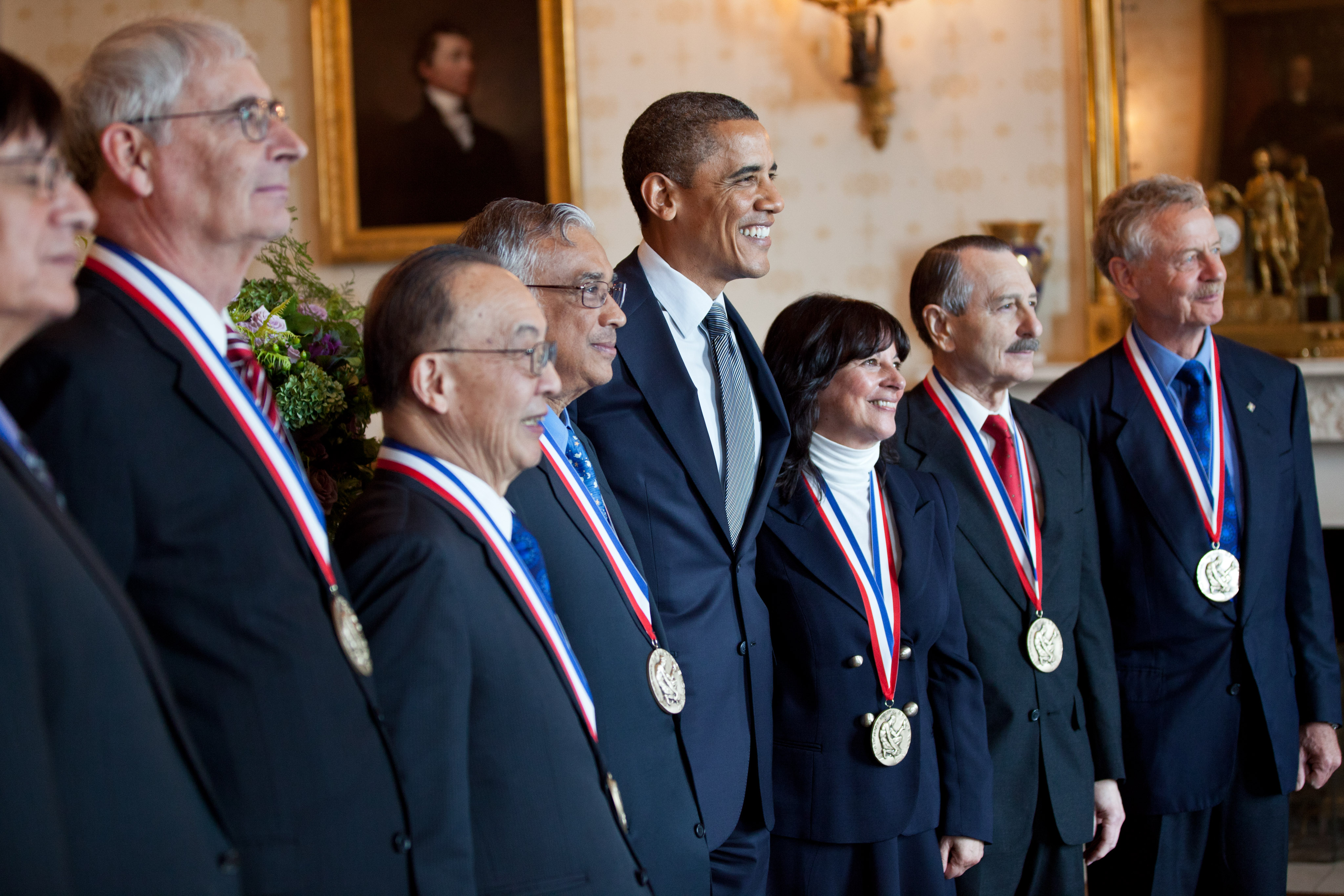
Barton (third right) receiving the National Medal of Science at the White House in 2011

Barton introduced the application of transition metal complexes to probe recognition and reactions of double helical DNA. She has designed chiral metal complexes which mimic the properties of DNA-binding proteins, allowing other researchers the capability to simulate and analyze experiments in this nature. Barton additionally established that DNA charge transport chemistry is extremely sensitive to intervening perturbations in the DNA base stack, as with single base mismatches or lesions. This discovery has been a cornerstone for the development of DNA-based electrochemical sensors.

== Awards and honors ==
Barton was awarded the National Medal of Science by Barack Obama in 2011, "For discovery of a new property of the DNA helix, long-range electron transfer, and for showing that electron transfer depends upon stacking of the base pairs and DNA dynamics. Her experiments reveal a strategy for how DNA repair proteins locate DNA lesions and demonstrate a biological role for DNA-mediated charge transfer." Other awards include:

- Alan T. Waterman Award of the National Science Foundation (1985), first woman recipient
- Fresenius Award from Phi Lambda Upsilon (1986), first woman recipient
- Eli Lilly Award in Biological Chemistry by the American Chemical Society (1987)
- American Chemical Society Award in Pure Chemistry (1988), first woman recipient
- Mayor of New York's Award in Science and Technology (1988)
- American Chemical Society Baekeland Medal (1991), first woman recipient
- Fellow of the American Academy of Arts and Sciences (1991)
- MacArthur Foundation Fellowship (1991)
- Garvan Medal of the American Chemical Society (1992)
- Tolman Award of the American Chemical Society (1994), first woman recipient
- Havinga Medal (1995)
- Paul Karrer Gold Medal (1996), first woman recipient
- Skidmore College honorary Doctor of Laws degree (1997)
- Nichols Medal of the American Chemical Society (1997), first woman recipient
- Weizmann Women & Science Award (1998)
- elected American Philosophical Society (2000)
- elected National Academy of Sciences (2002)
- Ronald Breslow Award in Biomimetic Chemistry from the American Chemical Society (2003)
- Yale University honorary Doctor of Science degree (2005)
- Hamilton College honorary Doctor of Science degree (2005)
- ACS Gibbs Medal (2006)
- Linus Pauling Award (2007)
- F.A. Cotton Medal for Excellence in Chemical Research of the American Chemical Society (2007)
- National Medal of Science (2011)
- elected Institute of Medicine (2012)
- Fellow of the American Chemical Society (ACS) (2014)
- Honorary Fellow of the Royal Society of Chemistry (2014)
- American Institute of Chemists Gold Medal (2015)
- Priestley Medal (2015)
- Centenary Prize (2018) from the Royal Society of Chemistry
- Fellow of the National Academy of Inventors (2018)
- NAS Award in Chemical Sciences (2019)
- Theodore Richards Award, Northeastern Section, American Chemical Society (2021)
- Welch Award in Chemistry (Robert A. Welch Foundation) (2023)
