= Chuan He =

Chinese-American chemical biologist

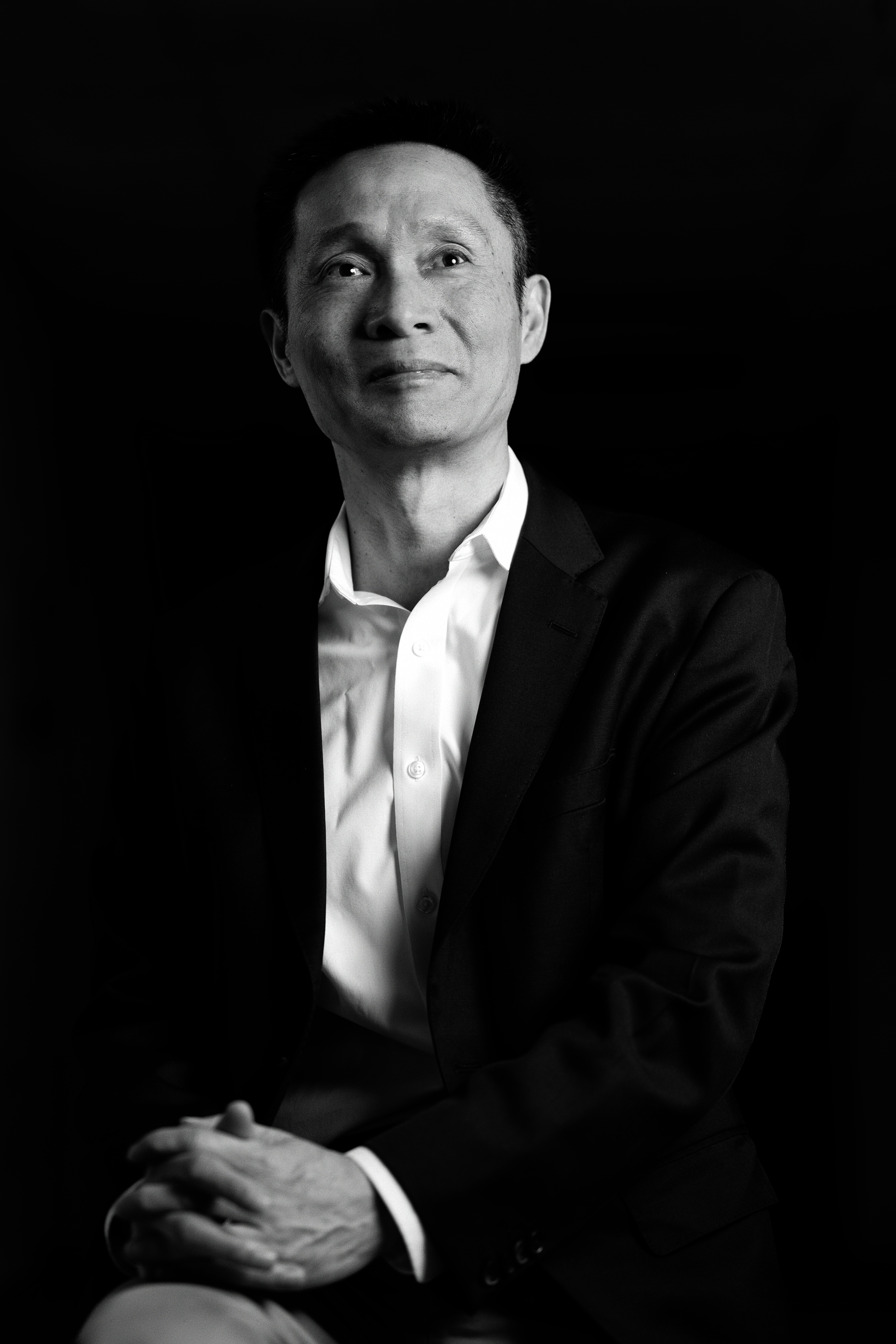
- Chuan He in 2025
- Born: 1972 (age 53–54); Guizhou, China
- Education: University of Science and Technology of China (B.S.); Massachusetts Institute of Technology (Ph.D.)
- Known for: Epigenetics, DNA Methylation
- Awards: Searle Scholar Award (2003); Beckman Young Investigators Award (2005); Paul Marks Prize for Cancer Research (2017); ACS Chemical Biology Lectureship (2019); Wolf Prize in Chemistry (2023)
- Scientific career
- Fields: Chemical Biology, Genetics
- Workplaces: University of Chicago
- Doctoral advisor: Stephen J. Lippard
- Other academic advisors: Gregory L. Verdine
- Doctoral students: Xiao Wang

Chuan He (Chinese: 何川) is a Chinese-American chemical biologist. He currently serves as the John T. Wilson Distinguished Service Professor at the University of Chicago, and an Investigator of the Howard Hughes Medical Institute. He is best known for his work in discovering and deciphering reversible RNA methylation in post-transcriptional gene expression regulation. He was awarded the 2023 Wolf Prize in Chemistry for his work in discovering and deciphering reversible RNA methylation in post-transcriptional gene expression regulation in addition to his contributions to the invention of TAB-seq, a biochemical method that can map 5-hydroxymethylcytosine (5hmC) at base-resolution genome-wide, as well as hmC-Seal, a method that covalently labels 5hmC for its detection and profiling.

== Education ==
He graduated from the University of Science and Technology of China in 1994 with a Bachelor of Science in Chemistry. After undergoing his Ph.D. training with Stephen J. Lippard at the Massachusetts Institute of Technology, he worked under Gregory L. Verdine as a Damon Runyon Postdoctoral Fellow at Harvard University. He subsequently became a faculty member in the Department of Chemistry at the University of Chicago in 2002.

== Research ==
In 2010, He proposed that RNA modifications could be reversible and may have regulatory roles. He and colleagues subsequently discovered the first RNA demethylase that oxidatively reverses N6-methyladenosine (m^{6}A) methylation in mammalian messenger RNA (mRNA) in 2011. The existence of m^{6}A in mRNA was discovered in 1974 in both eukaryotic and viral mRNAs; however, the biological significance and functional role were not known before He’s work. This methylation is the most abundant internal modification in mammalian mRNA. In 2012, two independent studies reported transcriptome-wide mapping of m^{6}A in mammalian cells and tissues, revealing a unique distribution pattern. He and co-workers identified and characterized the direct reader proteins for m^{6}A, which impact the stability and the translation efficiency of m^{6}A-modified mRNA, elucidating functional roles of mRNA methylation. His group also purified the methyltransferase complex that mediates this methylation.

The He laboratory also studies DNA methylation. He invented TAB-seq, a method that can map 5-hydroxymethylcytosine (5hmC) at base-resolution genome-wide, as well as hmC-Seal, a method that covalently labels 5hmC for its detection and profiling. Together with two other research groups, He and co-workers have revealed the DNA N^{6}-methyldeoxyadenosine as a new methylation mark that could affect gene expression in eukaryotes.

== Honors and awards ==
- 2003: Searle Scholar Award
- 2005: Beckman Young Investigators Award
- 2017: Paul Marks Prize for Cancer Research
- 2019: ACS Chemical Biology Lectureship
- 2018: Ray Wu Award
- 2023: Wolf Prize in Chemistry
- 2026: National Academy of Sciences
