= Laura L. Kiessling =

American chemist (born 1960)

Laura Kiessling
- Born: Laura Lee Kiessling; September 21, 1960 (age 65); Lake Mills, Wisconsin
- Education: Massachusetts Institute of Technology; Yale University
- Known for: Research on multivalent protein-carbohydrate interactions; carbohydrate polymers
- Scientific career
- Fields: Chemical Biology
- Workplaces: University of Wisconsin–Madison; Massachusetts Institute of Technology
- Doctoral students: Samira Musah

Laura Lee Kiessling (born 21 September 1960) is an American chemist and the Novartis Professor of Chemistry at the Massachusetts Institute of Technology. Kiessling's research focuses on elucidating and exploiting interactions on the cell surface, especially those mediated by proteins binding to carbohydrates. Multivalent protein-carbohydrate interactions play roles in cell-cell recognition and signal transduction. Understanding and manipulating these interactions provides tools to study biological processes and design therapeutic treatments. Kiessling's interdisciplinary research combines organic synthesis, polymer chemistry, structural biology, and molecular and cell biology.

== Education ==
Kiessling earned a B.S. in chemistry from the Massachusetts Institute of Technology in 1983 and a Ph.D. in chemistry from Yale University in 1989. At Yale, she worked with Stuart Schreiber to synthesize and study small molecules as probes of biological function. After earning her PhD, Kiessling spent two years at the California Institute of Technology as an American Cancer Society Postdoctoral Fellow, where she worked with Peter B. Dervan to study DNA recognition and cleavage.

== Career ==
In 1991, Kiessling joined the faculty of the University of Wisconsin–Madison, where she became the Steenbock Professor of Chemistry and the Laurens Anderson Professor of Biochemistry. While at UW-Madison, Kiessling also became the director of the Keck Center for Chemical Genomics and the National Institutes of Health Chemistry-Biology Interface Training Program. In 2017, she moved to the Massachusetts Institute of Technology as the Novartis Professor of Chemistry. as well as the editor-in-chief of ACS Chemical Biology.

Kiessling's contributions span the fields of organic synthesis, polymer chemistry, and molecular biology. She has made contributions to the synthesis and study of many biologically active molecules, including glycosyl donors, modified peptides, and glycopolymers. Kiessling's research has used these molecules to probe cell recognition and signal transduction processes (Figure 1). Her research has shown that multivalent ligands (molecules that possess multiple binding groups) can influence receptor-ligand binding mechanisms, activate signaling, and target specific immune responses. These discoveries have potential applications in targeted immunotherapy and disease treatment.

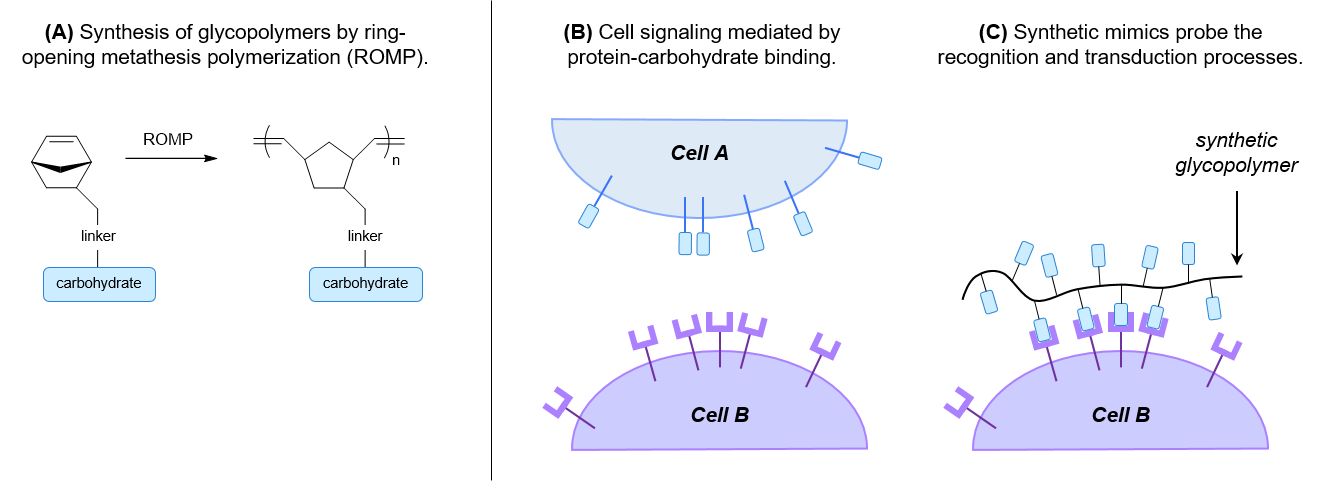
Figure 1. Overview of research in the Kiessling group. (A) Glycopolymers are synthesized by ring-opening metathesis polymerization. (B) Cell signaling can be mediated by protein-carbohydrate binding. (C) Kiessling's research uses synthetic mimics to study and manipulate the recognition and signal transduction pathways.

Kiessling has received a number of awards and honors in recognition of her research. She received a MacArthur Foundation Fellowship (popularly called the "MacArthur genius grant") in 1999. In 2007, Kiessling was inducted as a member of the United States National Academy of Sciences and in 2017, she received the Tetrahedron Prize for Creativity in Organic Chemistry.

Kiessling is a Fellow of the American Association for the Advancement of Sciences and the American Chemical Society, as well as an elected member of the American Academy of Arts and Sciences, American Philosophical Society, and American Academy of Microbiology. From 2005 to 2022, she served as the founding editor-in-chief of ACS Chemical Biology. Kiessling is also the cofounder of Quintessence Biosciences, a company that is working to translate her technological advances into cures for various diseases. She has been selected as one of the fifty top research and development "Stars to Watch" by Industry Week.

== Selected honors and awards ==
- 2022 Elected Member, National Academy of Medicine
- 2019 Centenary Prize, Royal Society of Chemistry
- 2017 Tetrahedron Prize for Creativity in Organic Chemistry
- 2017 Elected Member, American Philosophical Society
- 2016 Willard Gibbs Award, Chicago Section of the American Chemical Society
- 2014 ACS Alfred Bader Award in Bioinorganic and Bioorganic Chemistry
- 2010 Fellow, American Chemical Society
- 2008 Guggenheim Fellowship
- 2007 Elected Member, National Academy of Sciences
- 2007 Elected Member, American Academy of Microbiology
- 2007 Garvan–Olin Medal, American Chemical Society
- 2003 Elected Member, American Academy of Arts & Sciences
- 2003 Fellow, American Association for the Advancement of Science
- 1999–2004 John D. and Catherine T. MacArthur Foundation Fellowship
- 1999 Arthur C. Cope Scholar Award
