= Gisser =

Gisser is a surname. Notable people with the surname include:

- Kathleen Gisser (fl. 1992), American chemist
- Richard Gisser (born 1939), Austrian demographer
