= Christine Chow =

Christine Chow may refer to:

- Christine Chow Ma (born 1952), née Chow, Hong Kong-born Taiwanese lawyer and former First Lady of the Republic of China
- Christine S. Chow, professor of chemistry
