= Sarah Delaney =

American chemist and academic

- Education: Middlebury College; California Institute of Technology
- Scientific career
- Workplaces: Brown University; Massachusetts Institute of Technology
- Thesis: Oxidative DNA Damage by Long-Range Charge Transport (2004)
- Doctoral advisor: Jacqueline Barton
- Website: www.brown.edu/academics/chemistry/people/faculty/sarah-delaney

Sarah Delaney is an American chemist who is a professor and Associate Dean of Academic Affairs at Brown University. Her research investigates DNA damage and how it is related to human disease.

== Early life and education ==
Delaney was an undergraduate student at Middlebury College, where she majored in chemistry, researching the mechanism of action of cisplatin anti-cancer analogs. She moved to the California Institute of Technology for graduate research, where she worked alongside Jacqueline Barton on the role of DNA in charge-transfer reactions. In particular, she investigated whether the helical stack of base pairs in the double helix impact charge transport.

== Research and career ==
After her PhD, Delaney was appointed a Damon Runyon postdoctoral fellow with John Essigmann at the Massachusetts Institute of Technology, where she studied the mutagenicity of oxidized guanine lesions. Delaney has studied how DNA damage is related to human disease. At Brown University she serves as the Vernon K. Krieble Professor of Chemistry and Chair of the Department of Chemistry. In 2019. she was made director of graduate studies, and she implemented peer mentoring and regular advisor meetings for first year students, a journal club, a coffee hour and a weekly colloquium. She was made Senior Associate Dean of Academic Affairs for the graduate school in 2022. Delaney's focus is to create a simple and insightful blueprint to help understand how damage to DNA can relate to genetic changes and human diseases. She also has interests in how chemistry can be implemented in cooking and how it can influence food, as she teaches a course titled Kitchen Chemistry.

=== Awards and honors ===
- 2007 Damon Runyon postdoctoral research fellow at Massachusetts Institute of Technology
- 2010 National Institute of Environmental Health Sciences Outstanding New Environmental Scientist Award
- 2020 Brown University Faculty Award for Graduate Student Advising and Mentoring

=== Selected publications ===
- Long-range DNA charge transport
- Oxidative damage by ruthenium complexes containing the dipyridophenazine ligand or its derivatives: a focus on intercalation
- A New Equation for Calculation of Low-Density Lipoprotein Cholesterol in Patients With Normolipidemia and/or Hypertriglyceridemia
