= Catherine J. Murphy =

Chemist and materials scientist

Catherine Jones Murphy
- Born: 1964 (age 61–62); Morris Plains, New Jersey
- Education: University of Illinois Urbana-Champaign (B.S. 1986); University of Wisconsin-Madison (Ph. D. 1990)
- Known for: Gold Nanorods
- Awards: National Science Foundation CAREER Award; Alfred P. Sloan Fellow; Camille Dreyfus Teacher Scholar Award; Cottrell Scholar Award; Fellow of the Royal Society of Chemistry; Fellow of the American Association for the Advancement of Science; Fellow of the American Chemical Society; Member of the National Academy of Sciences
- Scientific career
- Fields: Chemistry, Inorganic chemistry, Nanotechnology, Chemical biology, Physical chemistry, Environmental chemistry,
- Workplaces: University of South Carolina, University of Illinois at Urbana-Champaign
- Doctoral advisor: Arthur B. Ellis
- Other academic advisors: Thomas B. Rauchfuss, Jacqueline Barton
- Website: faculty.scs.illinois.edu/murphy/index.shtml

Catherine J. Murphy (born 1964) is an American chemist and materials scientist, and is the Larry Faulkner Professor of Chemistry at the University of Illinois Urbana-Champaign. The first woman to serve as the head of the department of chemistry at UIUC, Murphy is known for her work on nanomaterials, specifically the seed-mediated synthesis of gold nanorods of controlled aspect ratio. She is a member of the American Association for the Advancement of Science, National Academy of Sciences, and the American Academy of Arts and Sciences in 2019.

== Early life and education ==
Murphy was born in Morris Plains New, Jersey in 1964. She attended junior high and high school in Glen Ellyn, Illinois, after her family moved to the Chicago suburbs in 1974. Murphy attended the University of Illinois at Urbana-Champaign (UIUC) as a first-generation college student. During her undergraduate studies, Murphy conducted research in the lab of Thomas B. Rauchfuss. She graduated with Bachelor of Science degrees in both chemistry and biochemistry in 1986. After graduating, she did a summer internship with Amoco Research Center in Naperville, Illinois.

Murphy earned her doctorate degree from the University of Wisconsin–Madison under the direction of Arthur B. Ellis in 1990. Her graduate work focused on the surface chemistry of semiconductors. Murphy completed postdoctoral work as a NSF and NIH postdoctoral fellow under the advisement of Jacqueline Barton at the California Institute of Technology from 1990 to 1993.

== Career ==
Murphy joined the faculty of the department of chemistry and biochemistry at the University of South Carolina in 1993, the first female faculty member on the tenure track in that department. She remained at South Carolina through 2009, becoming the Guy F. Lipscomb Professor of Chemistry in 2003.

In 2009, she joined the faculty in the department of chemistry at the University of Illinois at Urbana-Champaign as the Peter C. and Gretchen Miller Markunas Professor of Chemistry. She held this professorship until 2017, when she received the Larry R. Faulkner Endowed Chair in Chemistry at UIUC. In 2020, Murphy was appointed as the head of the department of chemistry at the University of Illinois at Urbana-Champaign, the first woman to ever hold this position. At UIUC, Murphy also holds affiliations with the departments of Bioengineering, Material Science and Engineering, the Materials Research Lab, the Micro and Nanotechnology Lab, the Center for Advanced Study, the Carle Illinois College of Medicine, and the Beckman Institute for Advanced Science and Technology. She is a senior investigator for the National Science Foundation Center for Sustainable Nanotechnology.

During her career at UIUC, Murphy has mentored and advised more than 7 visiting scientists, 12 postdoctoral researchers, 42 graduate students, 100 undergraduate students, 3 high school students, and 2 high school teachers. While at South Carolina, she advised 12 postdoctoral researchers/visiting scientists, 24 graduate students, 55 undergraduate students, and 14 high school students. She has received recognition for this service including the Siemens-Westinghouse High School Science Mentor Award in 2002 and the University of South Carolina Outstanding Undergraduate Research Mentor Award in 2003.

Murphy has published over 295 research publications. She edited two conference proceedings for SPIE, the international society for optics and photonics: the first in 2001 titled "Nanoparticles and Nanostructured Surfaces: Novel Reporters with Biological Applications," and the second in 2002 titled "Biomedical Nanotechnology Architectures and Applications" Since 2008, Murphy has been a coauthor of the general chemistry textbook Chemistry: The Central Science. As of 2024, she has an h-index of 104 according to Google Scholar and of 96 according to Scopus. Murphy holds three patents from the United States Patent and Trademark Office.

From 2006 to 2010, Murphy was a senior editor for the Journal of Physical Chemistry. From 2011 to 2020, she was the deputy editor of the Journal of Physical Chemistry C and as of 2020, a member of its editorial advisory board. Murphy is the chair of the Scientific Advisory Board for the Welch Foundation. She is also a member of the Board of Directors of the Research Corporation for Science Advancement.

== Research ==
Her research focuses on inorganic nanomaterials and the biophysical properties of DNA. Murphy is known for her work on the seed-mediated synthesis of gold nanorods of controlled aspect ratio. Her laboratory has developed the surface chemistry, biological applications, and environmental implications of these nanomaterials.

== Awards ==
Murphy has won numerous awards and recognition for her scholarship, research, teaching, mentoring, and overall career. In 2008, Murphy was elected a Fellow of the American Association for the Advancement of Science. She was elected as a member into the National Academy of Sciences in 2015 and the American Academy of Arts and Sciences in 2019. Murphy has been recognized as a Fellow of her field's associated professional societies including the American Chemical Society (2011), the Royal Society of Chemistry (2014), and the Materials Research Society (2017).

Murphy's career has included a number of firsts for women, some previously mentioned, such as the first woman on a tenure track at USC Chemistry and the first woman to be department head at UIUC. In 2013, Murphy received the Carol Tyler Award from the International Precious Metals Institute, which recognizes women who have made contributions to field of precious metals. In 2015, she received the Inspiring Women in STEM Award from Insight into Diversity.

Specifically recognizing her research, Murphy has won the National Science Foundation CAREER Award (1995), Alfred P. Sloan Foundation Fellowship (1997), National Science Foundation Award for Special Creativity (1998), U of SC Russell Award for Research in Science, Mathematics & Engineering (2005), Division of Inorganic Chemistry of the American Chemical Society Inorganic Nanoscience Award (2011), TREE (Transformational Research and Excellence in Education) Award (2015), Division of Colloid & Surface Chemistry of the American Chemical Society Langmuir Lecturer (2015), University of Pennsylvania Nano/Bio Interface Center Research Excellence Award (2016), American Chemical Society Maryland Section Remsen Award for Research and Teaching (2019), American Chemical Society Linus Pauling Medal (2019), Materials Research Society MRS Medal (2019), and PROTEOMASS Scientific Society Career Award (2020). In 2020, Murphy received the American Chemical Society's Award in Inorganic Chemistry. She is the first woman to receive this recognition.

In 2011, Thomson Reuters ranked Murphy as number 10 in their Top 100 Materials Scientists of 2000–2010, as number 32 in their Top 100 Chemists of 2000–2010, a Highly Cited Researcher in Material Science in 2014 and 2015, a Highly Cited Researcher in Chemistry in 2014, 2015, and 2016. Murphy was ranked a Highly Cited Researcher again in 2018 by Clarivate Analytics. Highly Cited Researcher designations are given to the top 1% of researchers based on the number of times their work was cited by others in a given year as determined on Web of Science.

For her teaching contributions, Murphy has won the Cottrell Scholar Award (1996), USC Mortar Board Excellence in Teaching Award (1996), Camille Dreyfus Teacher-Scholar Award (1998), U of SC Golden Key Faculty Award for Creative Integration of Research and Undergraduate Teaching (1998), and U of SC Michael J. Mungo Undergraduate Teaching Award (2001).

== Previous Heads, UIUC Department of Chemistry ==
Head	Years of Service	Years
A. P. S. Stewart	1868–1874	6
Henry A. Weber	1874–1882	8
William McMurtrie	1882–1888	6
J. C. Jackson	1888	1
Arthur W. Palmer	1889–1904	15
Harry S. Grindley	1904–1907	3
William A. Noyes	1907–1926	19
Roger Adams	1926–1954	28
Herbert E. Carter	1954–1967	13
Herbert S. Gutowsky	1967–1983	16
Larry R. Faulkner	1984–1989	5
Gary B. Schuster	1989–1994	5
Paul W. Bohn	1995–1999	5
Steven C. Zimmerman	1999–2000	1
Gregory S. Girolami	2000–2005	5
Steven C. Zimmerman	2005-2012	7
Gregory S. Girolami	2012–2016	4
Martin Gruebele	2017–2020	3
Catherine J. Murphy	2020–	

== Personal life ==
Catherine is married to Bob Murphy. They met while undergraduate students at the University of Illinois Urbana-Champaign. Bob Murphy was a mathematics instructor at the University of South Carolina and then the University of Illinois Urbana-Champaign. They currently reside in Urbana, Illinois.
