= Arthur B. Ellis =

American chemist

- Born: January 1, 1951 (age 75); Oakland, California, United States
- Education: California Institute of Technology; Massachusetts Institute of Technology
- Known for: Cyber-enabled chemistry, Applied chemistry on metals and semiconductors
- Awards: George C. Pimentel Award (1997)
- Scientific career
- Fields: Inorganic chemistry, Materials chemistry
- Workplaces: University of Wisconsin–Madison; National Science Foundation; University of California, San Diego; City University of Hong Kong; University of California Office of the President
- Doctoral advisor: Mark S. Wrighton
- Doctoral students: Kathleen Gisser; Gerald Meyer; Catherine J. Murphy

Arthur B. Ellis (born 1951) is an American inorganic chemist and research administrator. Formerly Director, Division of Chemistry, U.S. National Science Foundation, served as provost at City University of Hong Kong, vice chancellor for research at the University of California, San Diego, and as the Meloche-Bascom Professor of Chemistry at the University of Wisconsin-Madison. He is known for his work in applied chemistry on metals and semiconductors.

== Early life and education ==
Born in Oakland, California in 1951, Arthur Baron Ellis was a studious child who enjoyed chemical experiment from an early age, though he credits his high school and college teachers as the source of his "inspiration" for his field.

After obtaining his BS from Caltech in his native California, Ellis went on to graduate work MIT in Cambridge, MA. His initial research was in optimizing semiconductors and electrolytes to build better solar panels, in the laboratory of Mark S. Wrighton. This work earned Ellis his first patent.

== Career ==
Ellis went straight from graduate work at MIT to an assistant professorship at Wisconsin. He was known for in-classroom experimentation, levitating magnets and exposing undergraduates to high-level scientific equipment. "We can't have a static curriculum when research is so dynamic," he is quoted as saying. Ellis received one of the inaugural NSF Director's Distinguished Teaching Scholar Awards and an NSF Director's Meritorious Service Award. Facing what he believed was a "culture of a traditional American college chemistry course [that] was also off-putting to many students," Ellis was part of a coterie of scientists who advocated "cooperative learning methods and more sophisticated assessment and evaluation tools with the intent of turning these courses into pumps rather than filters."

Ellis published approximately 200 research papers in leading scientific journals while at UW-M, advancing through the ranks to sit for a decade as the Meloche-Bascom Professor of Chemistry. In this role he advanced the work of Ph.D. candidates who went on to leadership roles in American science, including chemists Peter K. Dorhout, Gerald Meyer, and Catherine J. Murphy.

Ellis was director of the Division of Chemistry at the National Science Foundation (NSF) from 2002 to 2006. The Division of Chemistry at that time was one of the five divisions that made up the Math and Physical Sciences Directorate at NSF. While at NSF, Ellis, together with colleagues, continued his focus on integrating education and research development programs to enable the USA's national chemistry community to "pursue large-scale research projects, enhance diversity, and advance bilateral international collaborations."

In his role as Director in the early 2000s, Ellis actively promoted cyber-enabled chemistry, the use of the cyber-infrastructure "to enable new chemical research and education activities through grid computing, community databases, remote access to instrumentation, electronic support for geographically dispersed collaborators, and other Web- and grid-accessible services." In this capacity, Ellis oversaw creation of the Chemistry Research Instrumentation & Facilities: Cyberinfrastructure & Research Facilities (CRIF:CRF) program, providing millions of dollars of grant money to academic institutions across the United States in fields as varied as Process Informatics Modeling and first-principle quantum dynamics methods. Ellis's portfolio included the establishment of Chemical Bonding Centers, intended to support long-term projects and transform chemistry research; Discovery Corps Fellowships, which supported nontraditional postdocs along with sabbaticals directed at service-oriented projects; and undergraduate research collaboratives to "enable college students to gain experience in chemical research."

Ellis moved to the University of California, San Diego in 2006, moving into academic administration as vice-chancellor for research. With colleagues, he "established a new research office to enhance the campus's infrastructure for research, promote interdisciplinary scholarship and create global research partnerships. He also helped launch campus-wide initiatives in sustainability, stem cell research and research cyber-infrastructure."

Ellis served as provost at City University of Hong Kong from 2010 to 2016.

In 2016, Ellis was named Vice President for Research and Graduate Studies at the University of California Office of the President. He retired from this position in 2019.

Ellis serves as a senior advisor at Elsevier, a scientific publisher and data analytics company.

== Recognition ==
- 1997 George C. Pimentel Award, sponsored by Union Carbide Corporation
- 1989 Guggenheim Fellowship (Chemistry)
- 1987 NSF Director's Distinguished Teaching Scholar Award
- 1985 H.I Romnes Research Fellowship, UW-M
- 1981 Sloan Research Fellowship
- 1980 American Chemical Society Exxon Solid-State Faculty Fellowship

== Selected publications ==
- Chemistry ConcepTests: A Pathway to Interactive Classrooms (Prentice Hall: 2001) Clark R. Landis, George C. Lisenky, Arthur B. Ellis
- Build a Better CD Player: How Can You Get Blue Light from a Solid (ChemConnections: 1999, 2004) Bradley Moore, George C. Lisensky , Arthur B. Ellis, Herbert Beall
- Materials Chemistry: An Emerging Discipline (American Chemical Society: 1995) Leonard V. Interrante, Arthur B. Ellis, Lawrence A. Caspar
- Teaching General Chemistry: A Materials Science Companion (American Chemical Society: 1993) Arthur B. Ellis et al
