= Christine S. Chow =

Chemist

Christy Chow
- Born: Christine S. Chow; New Jersey
- Education: Bowdoin College (BS); Columbia University (MS); Caltech (PhD)
- Known for: RNA-ligand interactions
- Scientific career
- Institutions: Massachusetts Institute of Technology; Wayne State University
- Thesis: Transition metal complexes as probes for higher-order structure in RNA (1992)
- Doctoral advisor: Jacqueline Barton
- Website: chem.wayne.edu/faculty/chow

Christine "Christy" Chow is a professor of chemistry (biochemistry division) and former associate dean of the College of Liberal Arts and Sciences at Wayne State University. She works on modified RNAs, RNA-ligand interactions and RNA therapeutics. She is a Fellow of the American Chemical Society (ACS).

== Early life and education ==
Chow was born New Jersey. She studied environmental science at Bowdoin College and graduated in 1987. She was a graduate student at Columbia University, earning a master's degree in 1988. Chow earned her doctorate in inorganic chemistry with Jacqueline Barton at the California Institute of Technology in 1992.

== Research and career ==
Chow was a postdoctoral research fellow at Massachusetts Institute of Technology, where she worked with Stephen J. Lippard. In 1994 Chow joined Wayne State University. Her research has been supported by the National Institutes of Health since she joined Wayne State University. Chow studies the structural and functional roles of modified nucleosides in RNA. So far, several hundred modifications have been found in RNA and Transfer RNA, but their contributions to structure and function have yet to be fully established. Chow develops the methodologies to incorporate modified nucleosides at specific points in RNA; in particular helix 69 of 23S ribosomal RNA. The pseudouridine modification helps to maintain fidelity during protein synthesis, but its exact role in regulating the function of a ribosome is unknown. They use inorganic complexes (such as platinum(II)) to examine the structure of nucleic acid.

Chow has used fluorescence spectroscopy and mass spectrometry to study drug-RNA interactions in an effort to inform the design of new antibiotics. Improved RNA binding ligands indicate that drugs have potential, and should be developed further. She developed assays to investigate aminoglycoside analogues. She is working on new anti-infectives that combat antimicrobial resistance.

=== Academic service and advocacy ===
Chow is an advocate for undergraduate research opportunities and diversity in the scientific community. In 2006 one of Chow's students, Uzoma Azuh, was diagnosed with acute myeloid leukemia. When he died in 2007, Chow created the Uzoma Azuh Endowed Memorial Research Scholarship, a fellowship for undergraduate students in chemistry and biochemistry, in his honour. She is a faculty mentor for an National Institutes of Health grant, the Wayne State University "Initiative for Maximizing Student Development", which supports students from underrepresented minorities in their scientific careers. In 2016, Wayne State University and Chow were awarded a multi-million dollar BEST (Broadening Experiences in Scientific Training) grant from National Institutes of Health to develop a doctoral training program for graduate students. She is a member of the leadership team of the American Chemical Society Women's Chemistry Committee and the Division of Biological Chemistry.

== Awards and honours ==
- 2010 Gordon Research Conference Co-chair
- 2011 American Association for the Advancement of Science Fellow
- 2015 American Chemical Society Fellow
