= ACS Chemical Biology =

- Discipline: Chemical biology, molecular biology, biochemistry
- Language: English
- Edited by: Chuan He

Publication details
- History: 2006–present
- Publisher: American Chemical Society (United States)
- Frequency: Monthly
- Open access: Delayed
- Impact factor: 4.0 (2022)

Standard abbreviations
- ISO 4: ACS Chem. Biol.
- NLM: ACS Chem Biol

Indexing
- CODEN: ACBCCT
- ISSN: 1554-8929 (print); 1554-8937 (web)
- LCCN: 2005212164
- OCLC no.: 58045459

Links
- Journal homepage; Online access

ACS Chemical Biology is a monthly peer-reviewed scientific journal published since 2006 by the American Chemical Society. It covers research at the interface between chemistry and biology spanning all aspects of chemical biology. The founding editor-in-chief was Laura L. Kiessling (Massachusetts Institute of Technology). Chuan He (University of Chicago) began the role of editor-in-chief in January 2022. According to the Journal Citation Reports, the journal has a 2022 impact factor of 4.0.

== Types of content ==
The journal publishes the following types of articles: research letters, articles, reviews, and perspectives, as well as specially commissioned articles that describe emerging directions in the field of chemical biology. Letters presenting findings of broad interest are typically five printed pages or fewer, while articles are twelve printed pages or fewer. Finally, reviews cover key concepts of interest to a broad readership. The journal has published the first three-dimensional interactive chemical structures replicating printed journal figures.

== Awards ==
- 2006 Award for Innovation in Journal Publishing from the Professional and Scholarly Publishing Division of the Association of American Publishers.
- Runner-up R.R. Hawkins Award for the Outstanding Professional, Reference or Scholarly Work of 2006.
