= Phosphomimetics =

Amino acid substitutions that mimic a phosphorylated protein

Example of a phosphomimetic substitution: aspartic acid compared to phospho-serine

Phosphomimetics are amino acid substitutions that mimic a phosphorylated protein, thereby activating (or deactivating) the protein. Within cells, proteins are commonly modified at serine, tyrosine and threonine amino acids by adding a phosphate group. Phosphorylation is a common mode of activating or deactivating a protein as a form of regulation. However some non-phosphorylated amino acids appear chemically similar to phosphorylated amino acids. Therefore, by replacing an amino acid, the protein may maintain a higher level of activity. For example, aspartic acid can be considered chemically similar to phospho-serine, due to it also carrying a negative charge. Therefore, when an aspartic acid replaces a serine, it is a phosphomimetic of phospho-serine and can imitate the protein always in its phosphorylated form. However, differences between the phosphomimetic compound and the phosphorylated residue, notably differences in Ramachandran distributions, charge states and size, can alter the protein sufficiently to result in significant differences in behavior. Phosphonate-based compounds have been used as phosphotyrosine analogues, as they are less enzyme labile and are physiologically more stable.

== Applications ==
This chemical similarity can be exploited in cancer, where a protein may mutate into an "always on" (constitutively active) state. A mutation may occur to replace a tyrosine (which needs to be phosphorylated in order to activate the protein) with an aspartic acid (which would not need to be phosphorylated). In a laboratory setting, the use of recombinant proteins to artificially introduce phosphomimetics is a common tool for studying phosphorylation and protein activation. For example, the IRF3 protein must be phosphorylated for its normal activity (transcription of its target genes, like IFNβ), but when serine amino acid residues were mutated to aspartic acid, the activity increased 90-fold. Phosphomimetics are commonly used in a gain of function experiment with respect to phosphorylation. For example, aspartate mutants were successfully used to probe the biological function of the phosphorylation of a threonine residue of a ribosomal protein both in vivo and in vitro to investigate a gain-of-function mutation on a kinase that is related to Parkinson's disease. Phosphomimetics were also used to investigate the therapeutic potential of proteins or peptides. For example, phosphomimetic mutants (using glutamate to mimic serine phosphorylation) have been used to demonstrate that the phosphorylated glycoproteins may have stronger anti-melanoma effects that the wildtype protein. This approach is in particularly useful as up to three serine residues can be phosphoylated on the said protein, and hence phosphomimetic mutants are useful to probe the function of the individual phosphorylation.
