= Gerald Meyer =

Researcher and academic

Gerald J. Meyer
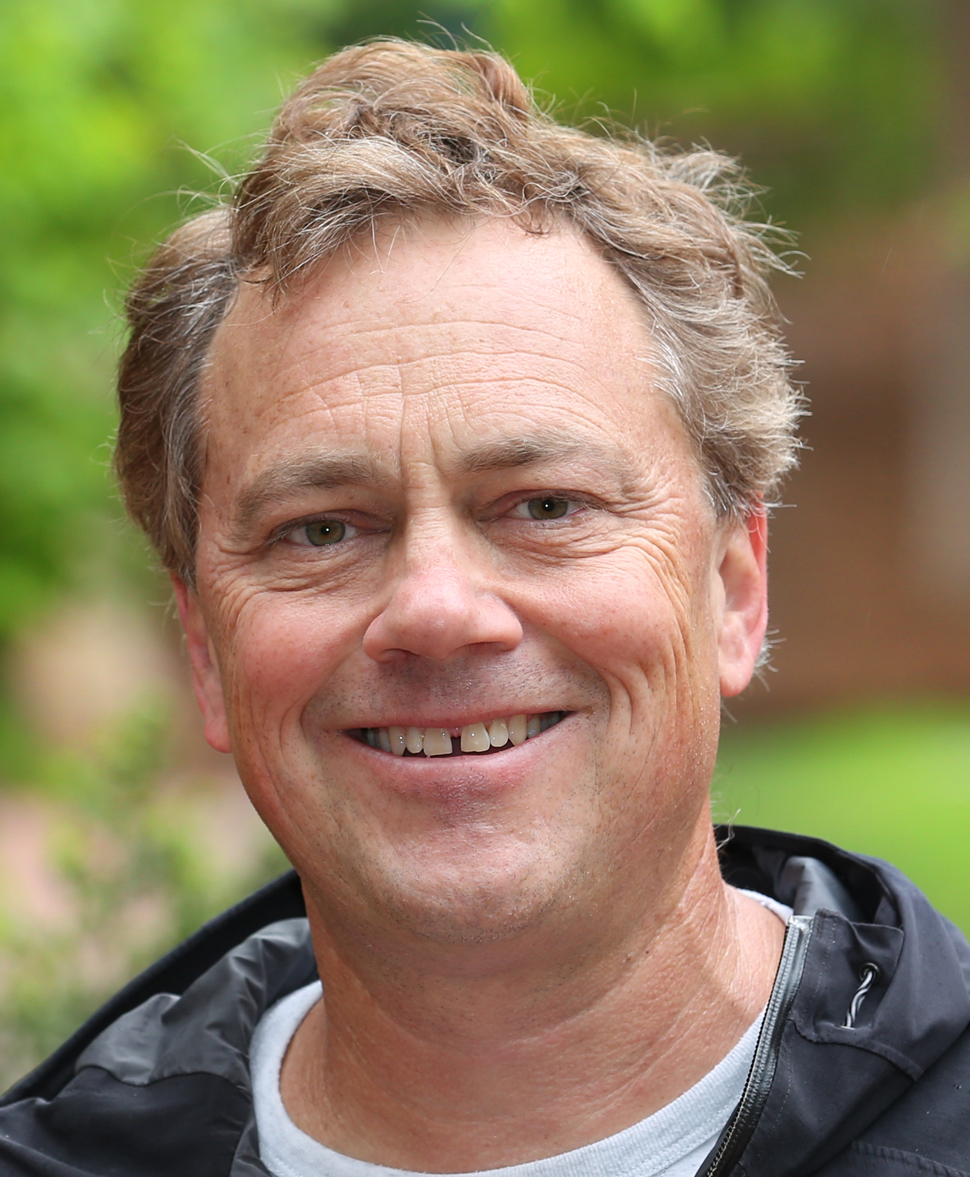
- Gerald J. Meyer, 2014

External videos
- “Interview with ACS Applied Energy Materials Deputy Editor: Gerald J. Meyer, Ph.D.”, American Chemical Society, Jun 13, 2018

Gerald J. Meyer is an active researcher and the Arey Distinguished Professor of Chemistry at the University of North Carolina at Chapel Hill. He was previously the Bernard N. Baker Chair In Chemistry at Johns Hopkins University. His research interests include inorganic photochemistry with emphasis on solar energy, using interfacial electron transfer processes and dye-sensitized solar cells.

== Education ==
Meyer earned a B.S. in chemistry from the University at Albany, SUNY in 1985. In 1989 he earned his Ph.D. in chemistry at the University of Wisconsin–Madison, where he worked with Arthur B. Ellis. From 1989-1991, he did postdoctoral work at the University of North Carolina at Chapel Hill with Thomas J. Meyer.

== Career ==
In 1991, Meyer joined Johns Hopkins University. Meyer was a director of the NSF Collaborative Research Activities in Environmental Science Center (CRAEMS) from 2002-2007. Meyer held the Bernard N. Baker Chair In Chemistry at Johns Hopkins University from 2009 to 2013, and served as chairman of the chemistry department at Johns Hopkins University from 2011 to 2013.

As of January 2014, he became professor in chemistry at the University of North Carolina at Chapel Hill. He is the director of the University of North Carolina's Center for Solar Fuels (UNC EFRC), an Energy Frontier Research Center funded by the United States Department of Energy.

He has served on the editorial advisory boards of the American Chemical Society journals Langmuir, Inorganic Chemistry, Chemistry of Materials. He is the associate editor of ACS Applied Materials & Interfaces (introduced in 2008) and the Deputy Editor of ACS Applied Energy Materials (introduced in 2018).

== Patents ==
- Chemical Sensing with Photoluminescent Semiconductor Materials. Meyer, G.J.; Lisensky, G.C.; Ellis, A.B. Serial No. 4,752,588. issued 1988.
- Solar Cells Incorporating Light Harvesting Arrays. Meyer, G.J.; Lindsey, J.S. Serial No. 6,596,935 issued 2003.
