= Michelle R. Arkin =

American chemical biologist

Michelle R. Arkin is an American chemical biologist and Professor of Pharmaceutical Chemistry at the University of California, San Francisco (UCSF).

== Education ==
Arkin obtained her B.A. degree in chemistry from Bryn Mawr College and her Ph.D. in chemistry at the California Institute of Technology with Jacqueline Barton. Later, Arkin held a Damon Runyon postdoctoral fellowship at Genentech under the mentorship of James A. Wells.

== Career ==
Arkin was a founding scientist at Sunesis Pharmaceuticals, where she helped discover and develop the anti-inflammatory drug lifitigrast (developed by SARcode/Shire), and anti-cancer experimental therapeutic vosaroxin (Sunesis).

Arkin is a Professor at the University of California, San Francisco (UCSF). Her lab at UCSF focuses on developing methodologies and functional molecules that target undruggable proteins, including challenging targets in diseases such as cancer and neurodegeneration. Her lab also studies the chemical biology of protein-protein interaction networks. Arkin was appointed as the Chair of the Department of Pharmaceutical Chemistry at UCSF in early 2021. Arkin is the Executive Director of the Small Molecule Discovery Center (SMDC) at UCSF, a center that collaborates with academics, pharmaceutical companies, and government labs to develop drug leads and chemical probes that address unmet medical needs. Arkin is an investigator in the UCSF Cancer Center, and the Bakar Aging Research Institute. She was also a member of the Rainwater Foundation's Tau Consortium. Arkin is a recipient of the Arthur C. Cope Scholar Award from the American Chemical Society (Organic division) and the Gordon Hammes Lectureship Award from the Biochemistry and Chemical Biology division of the American Chemical Society in 2024. She was the 2025 recipient of the Harrison Howe Award from the Rochester Local Section of the American Chemical Society. In 2026, she was elected a member of the American Academy of Arts and Sciences. In the same year, she was also inducted into the American Institute for Medical and Biological Engineering (AIMBE)’s College of Fellows. She was named the Eddie Goldenberg Research Chair of Canada in Chemical Biology to join the University of Toronto Mississauga in July 2027.

Arkin is also an adjunct professor at the Buck Institute for Research in Aging. She is involved with the academic drug discovery community, as Director and former President of the Academic Drug Discovery Consortium, editor of the National Institutes of Health Assay Guidance Manual, and Fellow and former Director of the Society for Laboratory Automation and Screening. Arkin is a cofounder and was a Director of Ambagon Therapeutics and cofounder of Elgia Therapeutics.
