= Xiao Wang =

Chinese-born biochemist

- Born: Xingtai, Hebei, China
- Education: Peking University, University of Chicago
- Scientific career
- Fields: Biochemistry, neuroscience
- Workplaces: Massachusetts Institute of Technology, Broad Institute
- Doctoral advisor: Chuan He
- Other academic advisors: Karl Deisseroth
- Website: www.wangxiaolab.org

Xiao Wang is a Chinese-born biochemist who is the Thomas D. and Virginia W. Cabot Professor of Chemistry at MIT and a Core Institute Member of the Broad Institute. Her research focuses on the development of tools and methods for analyzing the brain.

== Education and career ==
Wang studied at Peking University and received her B.S. in chemistry and molecular engineering in 2010. At Peking University she studied with Professor Jian Pei working on fluorescent organic materials. In 2015 she received her Ph.D. from the University of Chicago where she worked with Chuan He on elucidating the cellular functions of RNA modifications. While at the University of Chicago, Wang was awarded the Chinese Government Award for Outstanding Self-Financed Students Abroad and the Elizabeth R. Norton Prize for Excellence in Research in Chemistry. She was a postdoctoral fellow of the Life Sciences Foundation at Stanford University. She worked with Karl Deisseroth at Stanford and "developed comprehensive methods for analyzing RNA in intact tissues that merge sequencing with imaging, in order to reveal the locations of various cell types in the brain and to find out how these cells are connected."

Wang became an assistant professor at MIT in 2019 and the Wang Lab at MIT opened on August 1, 2019. In 2020 she was awarded a Searle Scholars Program grant. She is the first Core Institute Member of the Broad Institute with an academic appointment in the MIT Chemistry Department.

== Selected publications ==
- J Liu, Y Kim, C E Richardson, A Tom, C Ramakrishnan, F Birey, T Katsumata, S Chen, C Wang, X Wang, L M Joubert, Y Jiang, H Wang, L E Fenno, J B H Tok, S P Pașca, K Shen, Z Bao, K Deisseroth. Genetically targeted chemical assembly of functional materials in living cells, tissues, and animals. Science 2020, 367(6484), pp. 1372-1376.
- Y Liu, J Liu, S Chen, T Lei, Y Kim, S Niu, H Wang, X Wang, A M Foudeh, J B-H Tok, Z Bao. Soft and elastic hydrogel-based microelectronics for localized low-voltage neuromodulation. Nature Biomedical Engineering 2019, 3, 58–68.
- X Wang, W E Allen, M Wright, E Sylwestrak, N Samusik, S Vesuna, K Evans, C Liu, C Ramakrishnan, J Liu, G P Nolan, F-A Bava, K Deisseroth. Three-dimensional intact-tissue-sequencing of single-cell transcriptional states. Science 2018, eaat5691.
- I A Roundtree, G-Z Luo, Z Zhang, X Wang, T Zhou, Y Cui, J Sha, X Huang, L Guerrero, P Xie, E He, B Shen, C He. YTHDC1 mediates nuclear export of N6-methyladenosine methylated mRNAs. elife 2017,6, e31311
- H Shi, X Wang, Z Lu, B S Zhao, H Ma, P J Hsu, C He. YTHDF3 facilitates translation and decay of N6-methyladenosine-modified RNA. Cell Research 2017, 27, 315.
- B S Zhao, X Wang, A V Beadell, Z Lu, H Shi, A Kuuspalu, R K Ho, C He. m6A-dependent maternal mRNA clearance facilitates zebrafish maternal-to-zygotic transition. Nature 2017, 542, 475.
- X Wang, B S Zhao, I A Roundtree, Z Lu, D Han, H Ma, X Weng, K Chen, H Shi, C He. N6-methyladenosine modulates messenger RNA translation efficiency. Cell 2015, 161, 1388.
