= Daniel S. Kemp =

American chemist (1936–2020)

Daniel Schaeffer Kemp (October 20, 1936 – May 2, 2020) was an American organic chemist. He was a professor of chemistry at the Massachusetts Institute of Technology.

Kemp's work was focused on the synthesis and conformational analysis of peptides. He developed several chemical ligation strategies and methods for templating the formation of helices and sheets. The eponymous Kemp's triacid and the Kemp elimination reaction (and the Kemp decarboxylation variant) are among his developments. He was the author of an organic chemistry textbook. He died from COVID-19 during the COVID-19 pandemic in Massachusetts.

== Background ==
Kemp was born in Portland, Oregon. He received his Bachelor of Arts in chemistry from Reed College in 1958 and his Ph.D. from Harvard University in 1964, where he studied under R. B. Woodward. He was elected to the Harvard Society of Fellows.

== Awards and honors ==
- 1997 — Arthur C. Cope Scholar Award of the American Chemical Society
- 2000 — Ralph F. Hirschmann Award in Peptide Chemistry of the American Chemical Society

== Books ==
- Kemp, Daniel S.; Frank Vellaccio (1980). Organic Chemistry. Worth Publishers. ISBN 0-87901-123-8.

== See also ==
- MIT Chemistry Department
