= Glycopolymer =

Glycopolymer is a synthetic polymer with pendant carbohydrates. Glycopolymers play an important role in many biological recognition events such as cell–cell adhesion, the development of new tissues and the infectious behavior of virus and bacteria. They have high potential in targeted drug delivery, tissue engineering and synthesis of bio-compatible materials.

The first glycopolymer was synthesized in 1978 by free-radical polymerization. Subsequent efforts have been devoted to synthesizing glycopolymers with various structures and sizes, and the synthesis techniques have widened to controlled/living radical polymerisation, ring-opening polymerization, ring-opening metathesis polymerization and post-functionalization.
