= Robert S. Mulliken =

American physicist and chemist (1896–1986)

Robert Mulliken
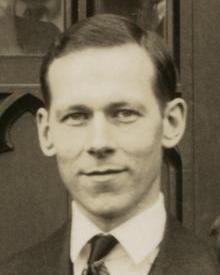
- Mulliken in 1929
- Born: Robert Sanderson Mulliken; June 7, 1896; Newburyport, Massachusetts, U.S.
- Died: October 31, 1986 (aged 90); Arlington County, Virginia, U.S.
- Education: MIT; University of Chicago
- Known for: Molecular orbital theory Mulliken charge Mulliken electronegativity Mulliken population analysis
- Awards: Peter Debye Award (1963); Nobel Prize in Chemistry (1966); Priestley Medal (1983)
- Scientific career
- Fields: Chemistry; Physics; Quantum mechanics

Robert Sanderson Mulliken (June 7, 1896 – October 31, 1986) was an American physical chemist, primarily responsible for the early development of molecular orbital theory, i.e. the elaboration of the molecular orbital method of computing the structure of molecules. Mulliken received the Nobel Prize in Chemistry in 1966 and the Priestley Medal in 1983.

== Early years ==
Robert Mulliken was born in Newburyport, Massachusetts on June 7 1896. His father, Samuel Parsons Mulliken, was a professor of organic chemistry at the Massachusetts Institute of Technology. As a child, Robert Mulliken learned the name and botanical classification of plants and, in general, had an excellent, but selective, memory. For example, he learned German well enough to skip the course in scientific German in college, but could not remember the name of his high school German teacher. He also made the acquaintance, while still a child, of the physical chemist Arthur Amos Noyes.

Mulliken helped with some of the editorial work when his father wrote his four-volume text on organic compound identification, and thus became an expert on organic chemical nomenclature.

=== Education ===
In high school in Newburyport, Mulliken followed a scientific curriculum. He graduated in 1913 and succeeded in getting a scholarship to MIT which had earlier been won by his father. Like his father, he majored in chemistry. Already as an undergraduate, he conducted his first publishable research: on the synthesis of organic chlorides. Because he was unsure of his future direction, he included some chemical engineering courses in his curriculum and spent a summer touring chemical plants in Massachusetts and Maine. He received his B. S. degree in chemistry from MIT in 1917.

==== Early career ====
At this time, the United States had just entered World War I, and Mulliken took a position at American University in Washington, D.C., making poison gas under James B. Conant. After nine months, he was drafted into the Army's Chemical Warfare Service, but continued on the same task. His laboratory techniques left much to be desired, and he was out of service for months with burns. Later, he contracted a bad case of influenza, and was still hospitalized at war's end.

After the war, he took a job investigating the effects of zinc oxide and carbon black on rubber, but quickly decided that this was not the kind of chemistry he wanted to pursue. Hence, in 1919 he entered the Ph.D. program at the University of Chicago.

=== Graduate and early postdoctoral education ===
Mulliken got his doctorate in 1921 based on research into the separation of isotopes of mercury by evaporation, and continued in his isotope separation by this method. While at Chicago, he took a course under the Nobel Prize-winning physicist Robert A. Millikan, which exposed him to the old quantum theory. He also became interested in strange molecules after exposure to work by Hermann I. Schlesinger on diborane.

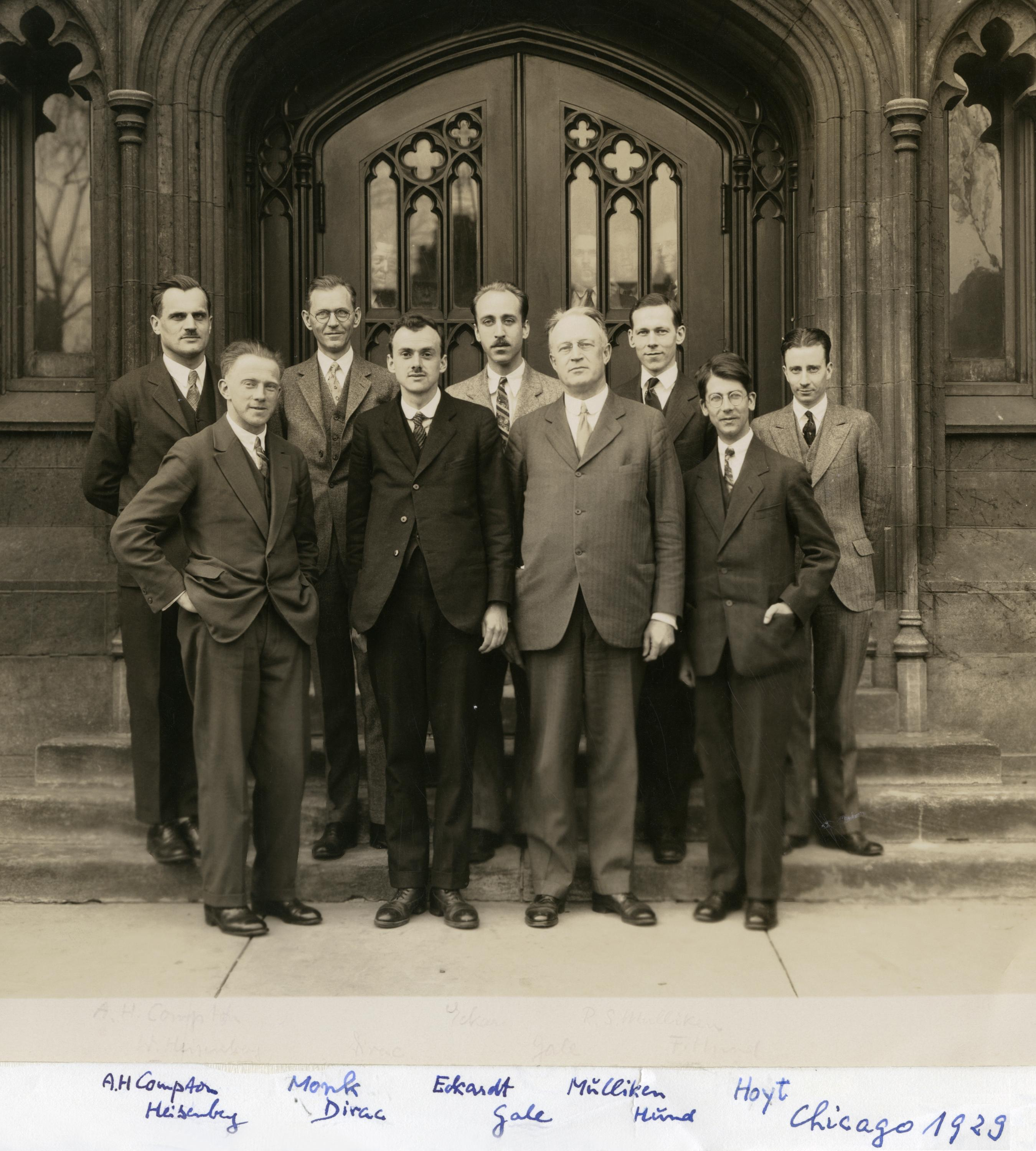
Robert Mulliken, Chicago 1929 (third from right)

At Chicago, he had received a grant from the National Research Council (NRC) which had paid for much of his work on isotope separation. The NRC grant was extended in 1923 for two years so he could study isotope effects on band spectra of such diatomic molecules as boron nitride (BN) (comparing molecules with B^{10} and B^{11}). He went to Harvard University to learn spectrographic technique from Frederick A. Saunders and quantum theory from E. C. Kemble. At the time, he was able to associate with J. Robert Oppenheimer and many future Nobel laureates, including John H. Van Vleck and Harold C. Urey. He also met John C. Slater, who had worked with Niels Bohr.

In 1925 and 1927, Mulliken traveled to Europe, working with outstanding spectroscopists and quantum theorists such as Erwin Schrödinger, Paul A. M. Dirac, Werner Heisenberg, Louis de Broglie, Max Born, and Walther Bothe (all of whom eventually received Nobel Prizes) and Friedrich Hund, who was at the time Born's assistant. They all, as well as Wolfgang Pauli, were developing the new quantum mechanics that would eventually supersede the old quantum theory. Mulliken was particularly influenced by Hund, who had been working on quantum interpretation of band spectra of diatomic molecules, the same spectra which Mulliken had investigated at Harvard. In 1927 Mulliken worked with Hund and as a result developed his molecular orbital theory, in which electrons are assigned to states that extend over an entire molecule. In consequence, molecular orbital theory was also referred to as the Hund-Mulliken theory.

=== Early scientific career ===
From 1926 to 1928, he taught in the physics department at New York University (NYU). This was his first recognition as a physicist. Though his work had been considered important by chemists, it clearly was on the borderline between the two sciences and both would claim him from this point on. In 1930, he travelled as a Guggenheim Fellow to work at Leipzig University with Werner Heisenberg, Edward Teller, and Friedrich Hund. Then he returned to the University of Chicago as an associate professor of physics, being promoted to full professor in 1931. He ultimately held a position jointly in both the physics and chemistry departments. At both NYU and Chicago, he continued to refine his molecular-orbital theory.

Up to this point, the primary way to calculate the electronic structure of molecules was based on a calculation by Walter Heitler and Fritz London on the hydrogen molecule (H_{2}) in 1927. With the conception of hybridized atomic orbitals by John C. Slater and Linus Pauling, which rationalized observed molecular geometries, the method was based on the premise that the bonds in any molecule could be described in a manner similar to the bond in H_{2}, namely, as overlapping atomic orbitals centered on the atoms involved. Since it corresponded to chemists' ideas of localized bonds between pairs of atoms, this method (called the Valence-Bond (VB) or Heitler-London-Slater-Pauling (HLSP) method), was very popular. In attempting to calculate the properties of excited states (molecules that have been excited by an energy source), the VB method does not always work well. With its description of the electron wave functions in molecules as delocalized molecular orbitals that possess the same symmetry as the molecule, Hund and Mulliken's molecular-orbital method, including contributions by John Lennard-Jones, proved to be more flexible and applicable to a vast variety of types of molecules and molecular fragments, and has eclipsed the valence-bond method. As a result of this development, he received the Nobel Prize in Chemistry in 1966.

Mulliken became a member of the National Academy of Sciences in 1936, the youngest member in the organization's history at the time. He was elected to the American Philosophical Society in 1940 and the American Academy of Arts and Sciences in 1965. He was elected a Foreign Member of the Royal Society (ForMemRs) in 1967.

Mulliken population analysis is named after him, a method of assigning charges to atoms in a molecule.

== Personal life ==
On December 24, 1929, he married Mary Helen von Noé, daughter of Adolf Carl Noé, a geology professor at the University of Chicago. They had two daughters.

== Later years ==
In 1934, he derived a new scale for measuring the electronegativity of elements, which he defined as the average of an atom's ionization enthalpy and electron affinity. This does not entirely correlate with the scale of Linus Pauling, but is generally in close correspondence.

In World War II, from 1942 to 1945, he directed the Information Office for the University of Chicago's Plutonium project. Afterward, he developed mathematical formulas to enable the progress of the molecular-orbital theory.

In 1952. he began to apply quantum mechanics to the analysis of the reaction between Lewis acid and base molecules. (See Acid-base reaction theories). In 1961, he became Distinguished Professor of Physics and Chemistry at Florida State University, and continued in his studies of molecular structure and spectra, ranging from diatomic molecules to large complex aggregates. In 1981, Mulliken became a founding member of the World Cultural Council. In 1983, Mulliken received the Golden Plate Award of the American Academy of Achievement. He retired in 1985. His wife died in 1975.

At the age of 90, Mulliken died of congestive heart failure at his daughter's home in Arlington County, Virginia on October 31, 1986. His body was returned to Chicago for burial.

== See also ==
- Mulliken symbols
- Adiabatic electron transfer
- Bonding molecular orbital
- Delta bond
- Halogen bond
- Walsh diagram
