= Helix 69 =

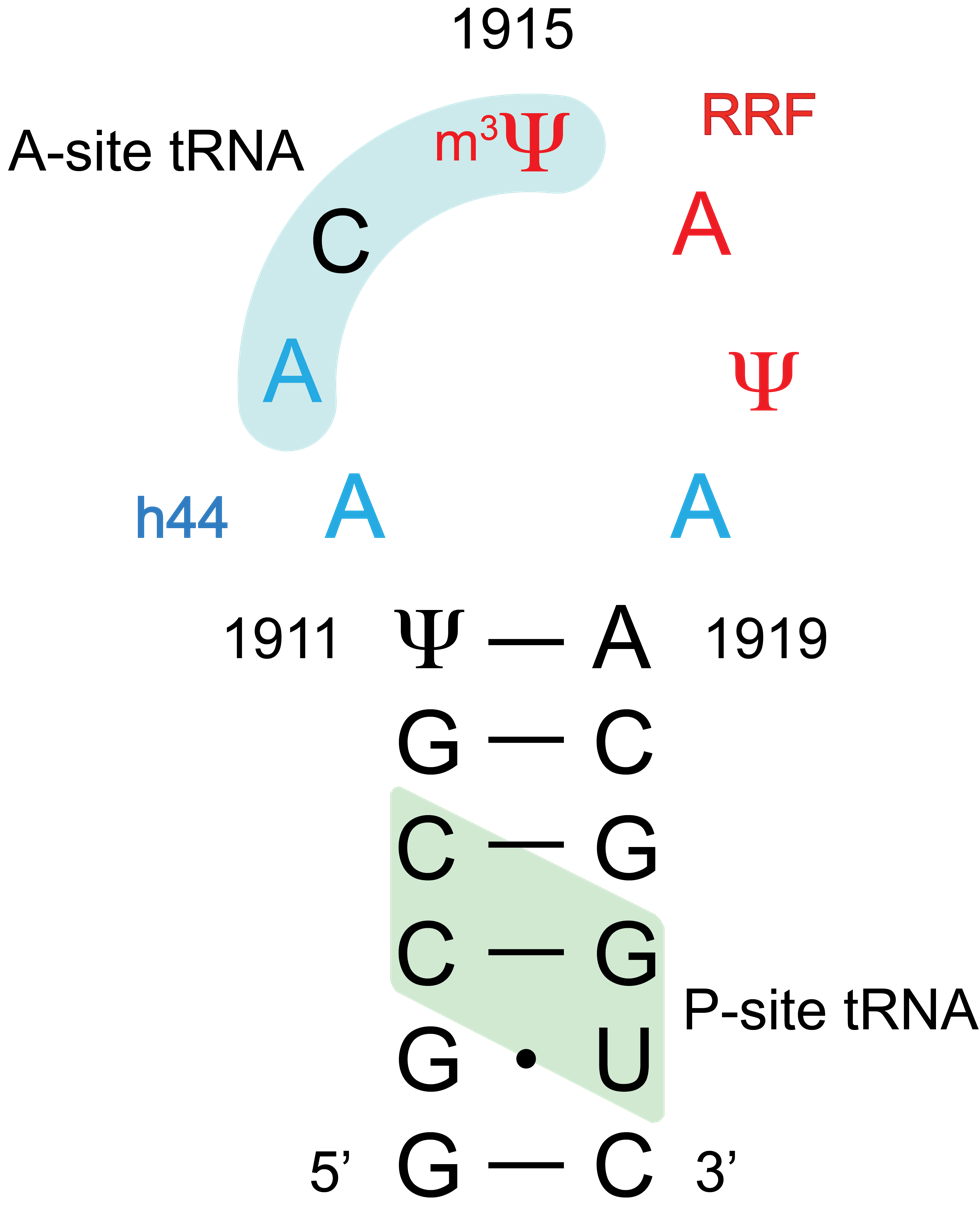
H69 E. coli

Helix 69 is a hairpin RNA structure containing 19 nucleotides in large subunit of the ribosome. Ribosome consists of large and small subunits joined with inter subunit bridges. Helix 69 interacts with the helix 44 (h44) of the small subunit to form the largest interface of two subunits called inter-subunit bridge B2a, one of the most conserved regions of the ribosome. Helix 69 is proposed to be a good drug target for antibacterial drugs. Many of the recent crystal structures have shown the involvement of this hairpin in different stages of the protein translation process. By targeting bacterial helix 69 specifically, protein synthesis in bacteria could be halted thus killing the bacteria.

Helix 69 shows a high degree of conservation in both sequence and secondary structure across phylogeny. An additional conserved feature of H69 is the existence of multiple pseudouridylation sites (E. coli numbering, positions 1911, 1915 and 1917), which have been mapped in E. coli, human and several other organisms.
