= Kathleen Gisser =

American chemist

Kathleen Collen Gisser is an American chemist known for her work in film products and architectural paint. As a senior staff scientist at Sherwin Williams, Gisser led the team responsible for the development of the first EPA-registered microbicidal paint.

== Early life and education ==
Kathleen (née Collen) Gisser was born in Cleveland, Ohio, where she attended the Laurel High School in Shaker Heights. She later attended Yale University, where she double majored in classical civilization and chemistry.

She went to the University of Wisconsin, Madison for graduate study in applied chemistry on metals and semiconductors, where she completed her Ph.D (1992) under the direction of Arthur B. Ellis, coauthoring several articles on nickel-titanium smart materials.

== Career ==
Gisser's first post following graduate school was at the Eastman Kodak Company in Rochester, N.Y., where her work focused on photographic/film technology.

In the mid 1990s, Gisser had a role on the Kodak team that won a technical Oscar for a film product that fixed the "scratches and pops and dirt" on damaged copies of film reels. Gisser wrote the nomination for the award, and would later give a keynote at the American Chemical Society Presidential Event (1999), describing techniques related to this project.

In the second phase of her career Gisser moved to Sherwin-Williams, where her focus moved to the development of new paint technologies. Paint materials were being rapidly adapted during this period, with a shift towards recipes deemed be less toxic or significantly lower in volatile organic compounds simultaneous with a drive for new markets and "performance features." In 2015, Gisser's team at Sherwin-WIlliams was responsible for the development of Paint Shield®, the first EPA-registered microbicidal paint. The CEO would tout the product as "one of the most significant technological breakthroughs in our nearly 150 year history of innovation." At that time, paints with applications for reducing bacterial levels of Staph and MRSA, were regarded as desirable for use by healthcare and athletic facilities. "These types of inventions are desperately needed...to prevent transmission [of] resistant bacteria." In subsequent years, use would be expanded "even [to] prefab military latrines."

== Recognition ==
A Sherwin-Williams Research Fellow, Gisser holds over a dozen patents in motion picture and photothermographic technology, and is the recipient of awards at both the corporate and national level. These include:

- 2021-2025 NSF TIP Award
- 2017, 2020 Percy Neyman Award
- 2010 Sherwin-Williams Innovation Excellence Award for Research and Development, Marketing and Technical Collaboration.
- 1995 Technical Academy Award for work in film at Eastman Kodak
