= Robert G. Shulman =

American biophysicist (1924–2026)

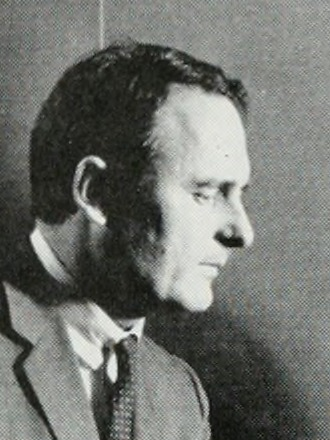
- Born: March 3, 1924; New York City, U.S.
- Died: January 11, 2026 (aged 101)
- Education: Columbia University
- Scientific career
- Fields: Biophysics
- Workplaces: Bell Labs; Yale University

Robert Gerson Shulman (March 3, 1924 – January 11, 2026) was an American biophysicist and Sterling Professor Emeritus of Molecular Biophysics and Biochemistry and a senior research scientist at the Department Diagnostic Radiology at Yale University.

== Early life and education ==
Shulman was born in New York City and on March 3, 1924. He graduated Phi Beta Kappa from Columbia University where he majored in chemistry and studied literature with Lionel Trilling, who encouraged Shulman's life-long interest in the humanities.

After graduating, Shulman joined the United States Navy Reserve. He served in the Pacific during the last days of World War II as a Lt, jg USNR on the USS Saratoga. After the war he entered Columbia as a graduate student. His war time work with radar brought him to the lab of Charles H. Townes, who was working with microwave spectroscopy. In a 2019 oral history, Shulman said:

When [Townes] was a physics student at Caltech, there was a book on electricity and magnetism ...and Charlie had read that book, and proofread it, and he had solved all the problems presented in the book to make sure that they were done properly. So he was the most thorough, best-studied scientist I knew."

Shulman received his Ph.D. in chemistry at Columbia in 1949.

== Career ==
From 1949 to 1950 was a fellow at California Institute of Technology (Caltech). There he met Alexander Rich, his roommate, who worked with Linus Pauling.

After this postdoc year, Shulman took a job at Howard Hughes' Hughes Aircraft Company, working with Harper Q. North who was running the company's semi-conductor program as part of the research group producing the Hughes Germanium Diodes, which were marketed as "Fusion-sealed in a glass." In 1953, he joined the physics research department at Bell Telephone Laboratories in Murray Hill, N.J., where he began research on the use of nuclear magnetic resonance (NMR) in condensed matter physics particularly studying magnetic materials like paramagnetic fluorides where he defined the covalent bonds and the exchange reactions responsible for their antiferromagnetism in these primarily ionic compounds. Eventually he became interested in Russian claims that DNA was a magnetic material which he showed were mistaken. In 1961 he received a Guggenheim Fellowship to study abroad as a visiting Professor of Physics at the École normale supérieure in Paris which, because his interests had shifted to biological materials, he transferred, with the blessing of the Guggenheim, to the Laboratory for Molecular Biology in University of Cambridge. "There was all sorts of speculation about DNA," he said while still at Bell Labs "so I went back to Alex Rich, who was by then an established biologist. I said, 'I'd like to go into biology, where should I go on my sabbatical?' The answer was 'Go work with Francis Crick if you can.'" In 1961–1962, he worked with Crick and Sidney Brenner in Cambridge, "in the old courtyard of the Cavendish Lab", helping to put "the finishing touches to Crick’s hypothesis as to how the DNA code was read for synthesizing proteins".

At Cambridge talking about what experiments to do next about how the genetic code was read, Francis walked around saying, "I feel as if at any minute the whole hypothesis is going to go down the drain. We'll do an experiment and it will disprove it all, and we'll be left with nothing." "I feel it every day I come in here, frightened by that." And that was such a wonderful thing to have heard about science. ..."I realize this is a hypothesis. We’re doing experiments that support the hypothesis, and it gives us confidence that the hypothesis is an accurate description of the world, some part of the world. But it's a hypothesis and we must never forget that. There was timidity, tentativeness in Francis's attitude towards scientific results, in that despite the success of his creative hypotheses he remained open to any results that will disprove it. And so it was really a lovely illustration of what science could be." (2019 Oral History). Another day Francis, in a discussion, said we could do Sidney's experiment which meant trying to experimentally identify chain terminators in the DNA which I volunteered to do and with guidance from Leslie Barnett managed to accomplish. But instead of continuing in Molecular Biology I was more interested in charting new directions for biological NMR and returned to Bell Labs to follow NMR and other spectroscopic studies of biological materials and organisms. With Terry Eisinger and Bill Blumberg I built up a group of young scientists which eventually became the Biophysical Research Department. Over several decades, we pioneered in the use of nuclear magnetic resonance (NMR), magnetic resonance imaging (MRI), other forms of spectroscopy and EXAFS to study biochemical processes. The research soon focused on non-invasive nuclear magnetic resonance studies in vivo of humans and animals

A propos of the direction he took on returning to Bell Labs, Dr. Shulman said,

I note that at that time (1962) metabolism had yielded center stage of biological research to the genetics made available by Crick’s DNA findings. However, I proposed to study metabolism which had been the traditional function of biochemistry, at that time generally ignored in the search for genetic knowledge, but which I felt could be re invigorated by the physical methods developed at Bell Labs. In this way I was combining the development of a physical technique with an extension of its applicability to biological problems by which I followed the practices of the two world-famous laboratories where I had worked. With that intention I returned to Bell Labs and started a biophysics department which attracted a wonderful group of scientists, where we studied biomolecules and developed in vivo methods of following by NMR the biochemical pathways of stable isotopes. Members of this Department subsequently went on to exciting developments, on their own, which earned one Nobel Prize, Kurt Wuthrich, the invention of fMRI by Seiji Ogawa and Kamil Ugurbil, and of neural nets by John Hopfield.

(2019 Oral History). They extended NMR in vivo and filled many important positions in academia, industry and governmental History)

Shulman joined the faculty at Yale University in 1979. He was a Guggenheim Fellow in 1962. He was a member of the National Academy of Sciences and the National Institute of Medicine. To the surprise of his new colleagues, he left the study of biomolecular structure in favor of in vivo pathways.

Helped from the beginning by Jeff Alger, Kamil Ugurbil and Jan den Hollander and soon after by Kevin Behar and Doug Rothman, the first of several graduate students, we continued the studies of in vivo metabolism in yeast, human muscle and brain. Yeast studies were conducted during the 1980s and their results were the basis of a Metabolic Control Analysis of glucose pathways of yeast in 2015 and 2020. Human muscle studies led to the important result that kinase activities changed the activity of enzymes not, as usually considered, to control pathway flux but to maintain homeostasis of biochemical intermediates. This established the ability to measure glycogen in vivo which, with the cooperation of two clinical colleagues, Gerry Shulman and Ralph De Fronzo, and actually performed by Doug Rothman who had become the scientific strength of our effort, was used to measure glucose pathways in Type 2 Diabetics as compared to controls. This showed that the flux of glycogen synthesis, which stored glucose as muscle glycogen, was controlled, not by Glycogen Synthase, as had been assumed, but by glucose transporters that were inadequately mobilized in Type 2 patients, and has subsequently been developed by Doug Rothman and Gerry Shulman as the mechanism of this prevalent pathology. 13CNMR studies of the human brain, once again led by Doug Rothman, measured the flux of the glutamate/glutamine cycle thereby quantitatively unifying electrical, neurotransmitter and electrical brain measurements which now form the basis of brain function. To the extent that these in vivo measurements of brain, yeast and muscle have succeeded in showing the powers of NMR and other spectroscopic measurements of energy the goal that I set in 1962 of unifying the strengths of Bell Labs and the LMB of Cambridge is being reached. In addition to the collaborators mentioned or unfortunately neglected in this account thanks are due to the Guggenheim Foundation whose far-sighted understanding of science made it possible.

== Personal life and death ==
Shulman was married to Stephanie S. Spangler, and had two surviving sons. He turned 100 on March 3, 2024, and died on January 11, 2026, at the age of 101.
