= Clark R. Landis =

American chemist

- Born: 1956 (age 69–70)
- Education: University of Illinois at Urbana-Champaign B.A. (1980); University of Chicago Ph.D. (1983)
- Scientific career
- Workplaces: Monsanto; University of Colorado Boulder; University of Wisconsin-Madison
- Thesis: The activity and selectivity of (bisphosphine) rhodium hydrogenation catalysts (1983)
- Website: https://landis.chem.wisc.edu/

Clark Landis (born 1956) is an American chemist, whose research focuses on organic and inorganic chemistry. He is currently a Professor of Chemistry at the University of Wisconsin–Madison. He was awarded the ACS Award in Organometallic Chemistry in 2010, and is a fellow of the American Chemical Society and the American Association for the Advancement of Science.

== Education ==
In 1980, Landis received a Bachelor of Arts from the University of Illinois at Urbana–Champaign (UIUC). At UIUC, he worked with Paul R. Robinson on ligand exchange reactions in molybdenum oxo complexes. In 1983, he received his Ph.D. degree from the University of Chicago. At Chicago, Landis worked with Prof. Jack Halpern on mechanistic studies of cationic rhodium catalysts that perform hydrogenation of alkenes, including a catalyst that performs enantioselective hydrogenation. He then worked for three years as a senior research chemist at Monsanto's corporate research laboratory, also on enantioselective hydrogenation with rhodium catalysts.

In 1986, Landis began his independent academic career at the University of Colorado Boulder. He moved to the University of Wisconsin-Madison in 1990 and has been a full Professor since 1997.

== Research focuses ==
Landis's research focuses on the asymmetric hydroformylation (AHF) of alkenes and alkynes through rhodium-based (Rh) catalysts with phosphine ligands. Rh catalysts with bisdiazaphospholane (BDP) ligands, shown in Figure 2, could convert substrates into highly enantio- and regio-specific aldehyde products. Landis and co-workers are also the inventors and patent holders of BDP and other diazaphosphacycle metal complexes.

=== AHF ===
Hydroformylation (AHF) converts alkenes to aldehydes. AHF has a wide range of industrial applications, including synthesizing linear aliphatic aldehydes. For example, making butanal from propene. Also, AHF is commercially used to synthesize aromatic aldehydes, including anti-inflammatory agents: ibuprofen and naproxen.

Figure 1: General Asymmetric Hydroformylation reaction of olefins to produce aldehydes.

=== AHF is Stereospecific ===
Wilkinson and Brown first discovered Rh-based catalysts in the 70s’. AHF of alkenes with Rh-based catalysts could yield high ratio of linear chain to branched chain aldehydes. Recent work from Landis group showed how AHF of non-linear compounds with Rh-based catalysts can produce stereospecific aldehydes.

=== Rh-BDP Catalysts and Alkenes ===
AHFs of alkenes, specifically enol esters and enamides, with Rh-BDP catalysts yield high concentration of stereo and regio-specific aldehydes. Adding extra functional groups to the alkenes does not interfere with specificity or degree of AHF.

=== AHF is Affected by CO Concentration ===
Complex alkenes with multiple branches and/or multiple chiral centers are more difficult to go through stereospecific AHF, compared to linear alkenes. NMR and IR spectroscopies indicate olefin substrates often rearrange their more substituted chains or carbonyl groups to increase the compounds' thermodynamic stability. CO concentration also affects the rate and probability of isomerization. CO concentration and the relatively complex reaction steps make assigning specific steps in metal-ligand catalyzed AHF as a rate or product determinant a more difficult task.

=== AHF is Affected by Pressure ===
Pressure also affects AHF of olefins by altering the kinetics in the reaction pathways. For example, styrene is converted to linear isomers under lower pressure but branched isomers under higher pressure.

=== Synthesis of BDP Ligand ===
Bisdiazaphospholane (BDP) on Rh increases reactivity and enantioselectivity of olefin AHF. However, BDP is difficult to purify in its enantiopure form through common purification techniques, such as, column chromatography. Jones recently synthesized BDP, resulting in a scalable and commercial production. The processes include the synthesis of racemic mixture of tetracarboxylic acid, separation of an enantiomer by selective recrystallization of diastereomeric salts, amide bond formation, and crystallization of purified BDP. These processes produce high yield of pure BDP, so greater modification of Rh-BDP catalysts could enhance alkene AHF.

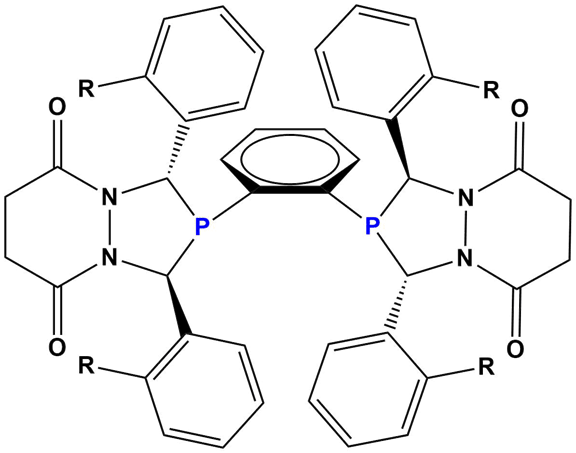
Figure 2: Bisdiazaphospholane (BDP), the ligand for Rh-based catalyst.

=== AHF Products Prediction ===
A library of BDP derivatives with specific chiral center arrangement and substituents was made to study AHF on olefins. Structure of BDP affects the degree of enantio-, regio- selectivity, and branched:linear ratio of aldehyde products on a wide range of olefin reactants, including 2,3-dihydrofuran and styrene. The data collected helps with predicting the possible aldehyde products from olefin of interest.

=== Rh Catalyst can be Used to Synthesis Polyester ===
Rh-based catalysts also polymerize carboxylic acids into oligo(2-hydroxyacid) s through hydroacyloxylation with alkynes. The oligomer is then modified to remove the alkenyl groups. AHF then converts the oligomer to aldehydes. This novel approach of polyester synthesis needs further adjustments to improve its efficiency so it may be industrially applicable.

== Awards ==
- Fellow, American Chemical Society, since 2012
- ACS Award in Organometallic Chemistry, 2010
- Fellow, American Association for the Advancement of Science, since 2009
- Hutchison Lecturer, University of Rochester
- Fellow of the Japan Society for the Promotion of Science
- Dow Lecturer in Inorganic Chemistry, University of California, Berkeley
- Vilas Associates Award, UW-Madison, 1997-1998
- Upjohn Teaching Award, UW-Madison, Fall 1995
- Departmental Teaching Award, UW-Madison, Spring1992
- NIH FIRST Award, 1988
- Junior Faculty Development Award, University of Colorado, 1987
- Dreyfus Distinguished New Faculty Award, University of Colorado, 1986
- Mark Galler Award for Most Distinguished Ph.D. Dissertation in the Physical Sciences, University of Chicago, 1984
