= Samuel Parsons Mulliken =

MIT Professor of organic chemistry

Samuel Parsons Mulliken (1864 – 1934) was an American professor of organic chemistry at the Massachusetts Institute of Technology.

His son was Nobel laureate Robert S. Mulliken.
