= Sarah Nusser =

American statistician

- Born: 1957 (age 68–69)
- Education: University of Wisconsin–Madison, North Carolina State University, Iowa State University
- Occupations: statistician, professor
- Employer(s): Procter & Gamble, Iowa State University
- Known for: director of the Center for Survey Statistics and Methodology, Iowa State University
- Notable work: Failure Time Analyses for Data Collected from Independent Groups of Correlated Individuals
- Awards: Fellow of the American Statistical Association

Sarah Margaret Nusser (born 1957) is an American statistician and expert on survey methodology. She is vice president for research at Iowa State University, where she is also a professor of statistics and the former director of the Center for Survey Statistics and Methodology. As well as survey statistics, her research publications have included contributions to human nutrition and to environmental statistics.

== Education and career ==
Nusser majored in botany at the University of Wisconsin–Madison, where she graduated in 1980. After earning a master's degree in botany at North Carolina State University in 1983, she switched to Iowa State University for graduate study in statistics, earning a second master's degree in 1987 and completing her Ph.D. in 1990. Her dissertation, Failure Time Analyses for Data Collected from Independent Groups of Correlated Individuals, was supervised by Kenneth J. Koehler.

After working for Procter & Gamble as a statistician, she became an assistant professor at Iowa State in 1992. She served as director of the Center for Survey Statistics and Methodology from 1992 to 2004 and 2007 to 2010, and became affiliated with the graduate programs in Ecology and Evolutionary Biology in 1994 and in Human Computer Interaction in 2004. She was promoted to full professor in 2003, and became vice president for research in 2014.

== Recognition ==
Nusser became a Fellow of the American Statistical Association in 2003, and an Elected Member of the International Statistical Institute in 2012. She was named to the 2021 class of Fellows of the American Association for the Advancement of Science.
