= John Essigmann =

American chemist

John M. Essigman is an American chemist, currently the William R. & Betsy P. Leitch Professor in Residence of Chemistry, Toxicology, and Biological Engineering at the Massachusetts Institute of Technology.
