= Isomerization =

Transformation of the chemical structure of a molecule or ion

The change in shape of a protein into a different configuration, such as a protein changing from its cis conformation to its trans conformation (or vice versa).

In chemistry, isomerization or isomerisation is the process in which a molecule, polyatomic ion or molecular fragment is transformed into an isomer with a different chemical structure. Enolization is an example of isomerization, as is tautomerization.

When the activation energy for the isomerization reaction is sufficiently small, both isomers can often be observed and the equilibrium ratio will shift in a temperature-dependent equilibrium with each other. Many values of the standard free energy difference, $\Delta G^\circ$, have been calculated, with good agreement between observed and calculated data.

== Examples and applications ==
=== Alkanes ===
Skeletal isomerization occurs in the cracking process, used in the petrochemical industry to convert straight chain alkanes to isoparaffins as exemplified in the conversion of normal octane to 2,5-dimethylhexane (an "isoparaffin"):

Fuels containing branched hydrocarbons are favored for internal combustion engines for their higher octane rating. Diesel engines however operate better with straight-chain hydrocarbons.

=== Alkenes ===
==== Cis vs trans ====
Trans-alkenes are about 1 kcal/mol more stable than cis-alkenes. An example of this effect is cis- vs trans-2-butene. The difference is attributed to unfavorable non-bonded interactions in the cis isomer. This effects helps to explain the formation of trans-fats in food processing. In some cases, the isomerization can be reversed using UV-light. The trans isomer of resveratrol converts to the cis isomer in a photochemical reaction.

==== Terminal vs internal ====
Terminal alkenes prefer to isomerize to internal alkenes:

H_{2}C=CHCH_{2}CH_{3} → CH_{3}CH=CHCH_{3}

The conversion essentially does not occur in the absence of metal catalysts. This process is employed in the Shell higher olefin process to convert alpha-olefins to internal olefins, which are subjected to olefin metathesis.

=== Other organic examples ===
Isomerism is a major topic in sugar chemistry. Glucose, the most common sugar, exists in four forms.

Isomers of d-glucose
α-d-glucofuranose	β-d-glucofuranose
α-d-glucopyranose	β-d-glucopyranose

Aldose-ketose isomerism, also known as Lobry de Bruyn–van Ekenstein transformation, provides an example in saccharide chemistry.

=== Inorganic and organometallic chemistry ===
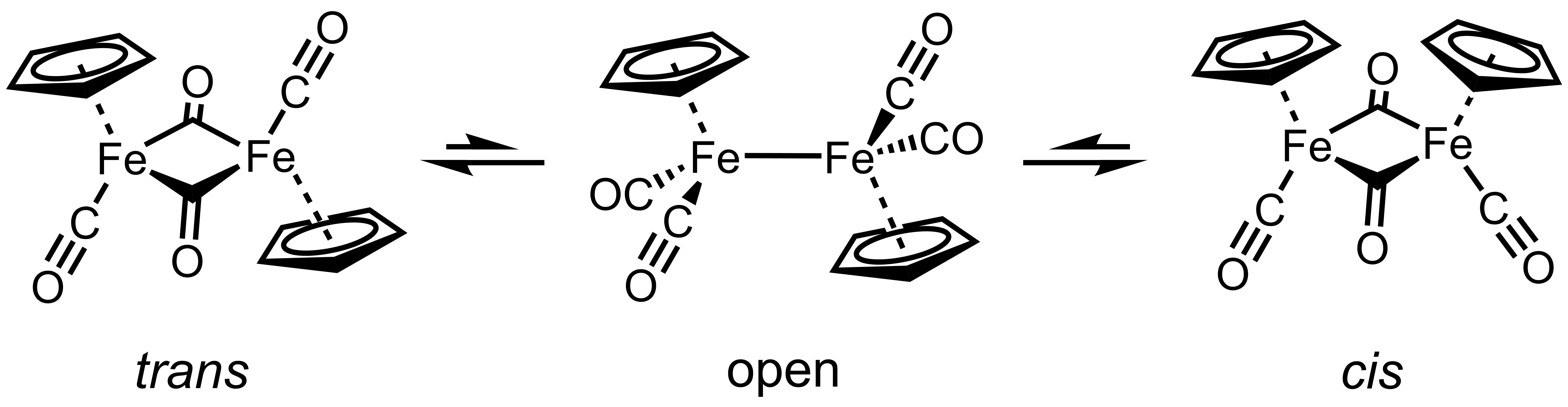

The compound with the formula (C_{5}H_{5})_{2}Fe_{2}(CO)_{4} exists as three isomers in solution. In one isomer the CO ligands are terminal. When a pair of CO are bridging, cis and trans isomers are possible depending on the location of the C_{5}H_{5} groups.

Another example in organometallic chemistry is the linkage isomerization of decaphenylferrocene, [(η^{5}-C_{5}Ph_{5})_{2}Fe].

Formation of decaphenylferrocene from its linkage isomer

=== Biochemistry ===
isomerases are a general class of enzymes that convert a molecule from one isomer to another.

== Kinetic classification ==
From the kinetic viewpoint, isomerizations can be classified into two categories. Cases in the first category involve transformations between equivalent structures. Most chemical species are in principle susceptible to such processes. Many such cases involve fluxional molecules, such as the cyclohexane ring flip (chair inversion), the pyramidal inversion of ammonia, the Berry pseudorotation in pentacoordinate compounds (e.g. PF_{5}, Fe(CO)_{5}), the Cope rearrangements of bullvalene or the Ray-Dutt/Bailar twists for the racemization of octahedral complexes with three bidentate chelate rings (helical chirality).

In the second broad category of isomerizations, the isomers are nonequivalent. Examples include tautomerizations (keto-enol, lactam-lactim, amide-imidic, enamine-imine, nitroso-oxime, ketene-ynol, etc) in which one isomer is more stable than the other.

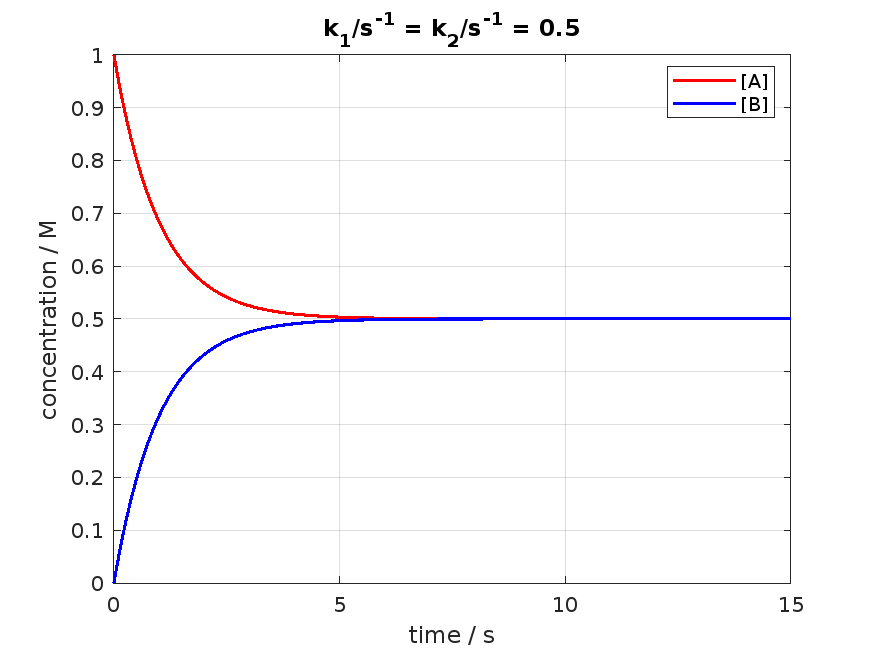
Concentration profile for the reaction mechanism A = B when k1 = k2

This scheme leads to the following system of differential rate equations:

== See also ==
- Base-promoted epoxide isomerization
- Epimerization
- Racemization
- Tautomerization
- Linkage isomerism
