= Tris(acetylacetonato)iron(III) =

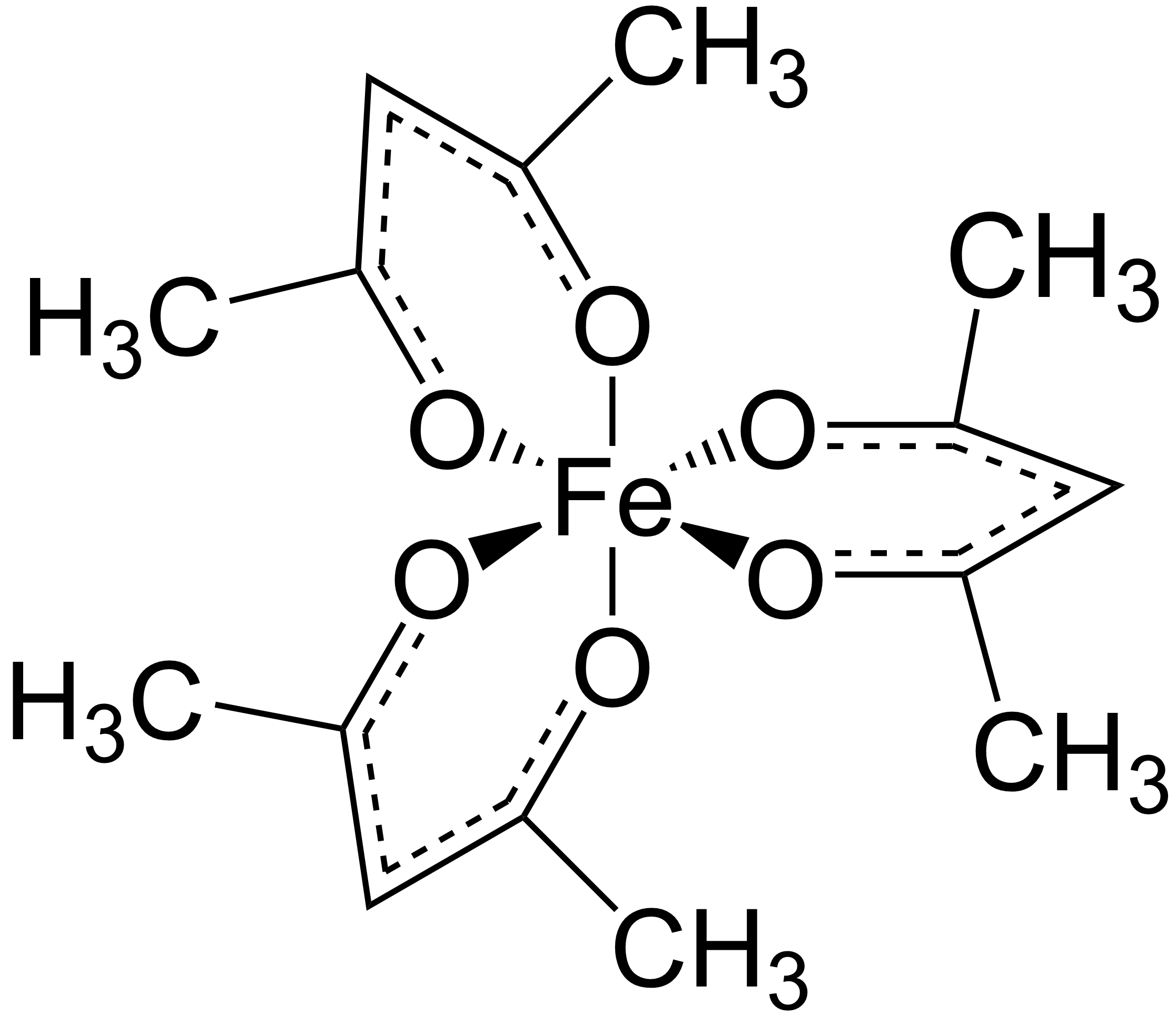

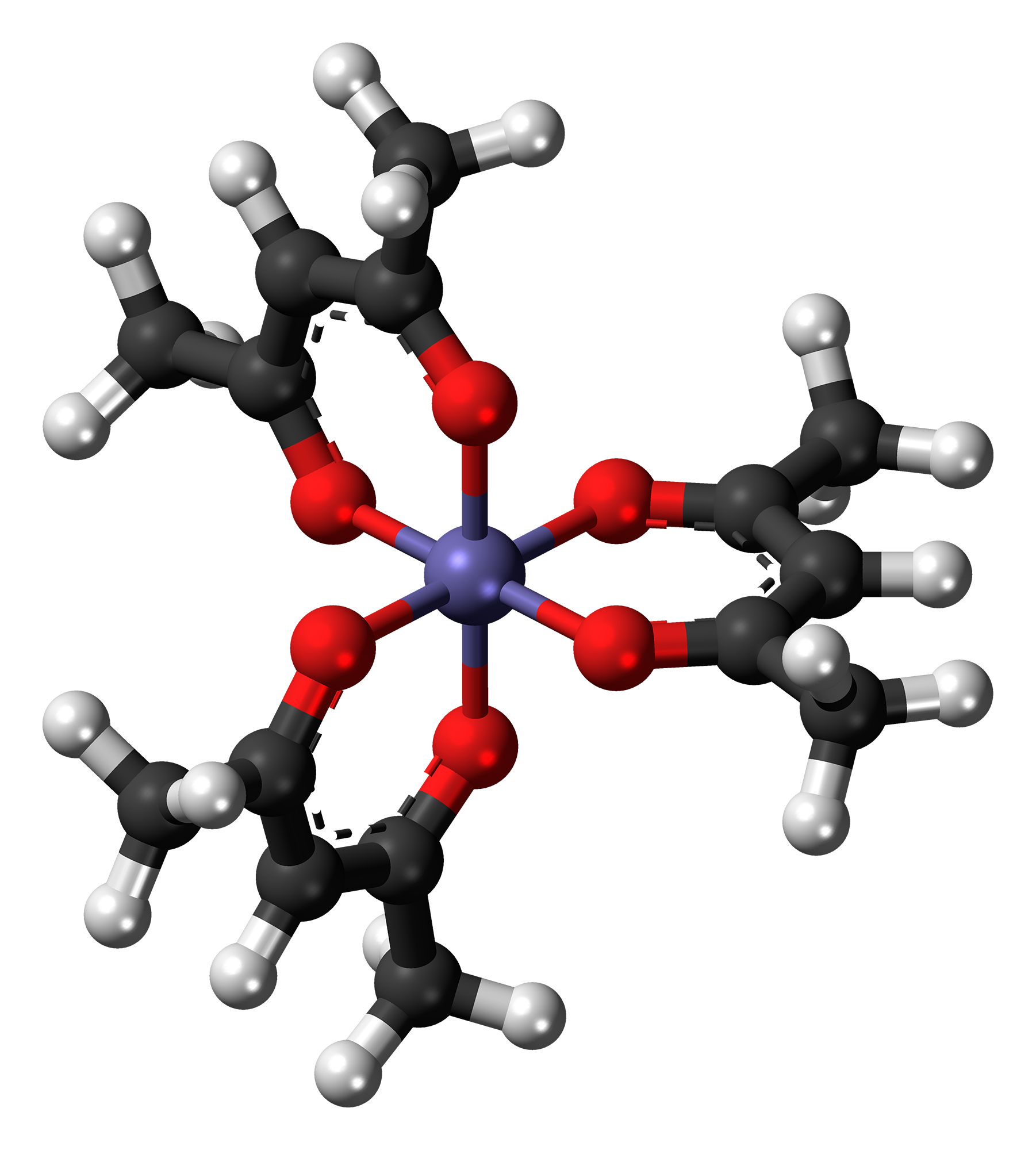

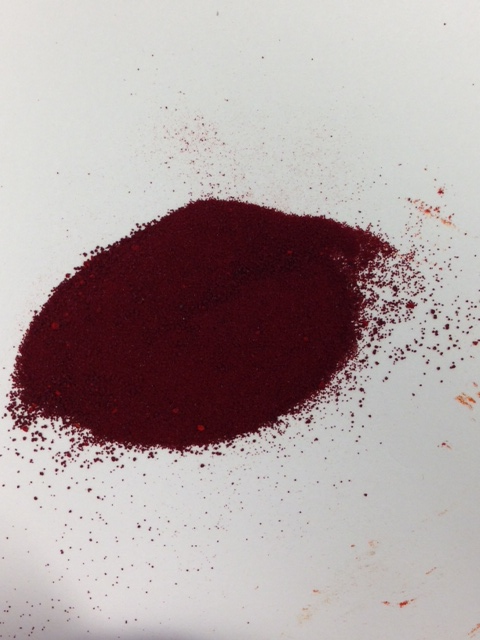

Names
- IUPAC name Tris(acetylacetonato)iron(III)
- Systematic IUPAC name Tris[(Z)-4-oxopent-2-en-2-olato-κ^{2}O,O′]iron(III)
- Other names Iron(III) acetylacetonate, Iron(III) tris(2,4-pentanedionato), Fe(acac)_{3}

Identifiers
CAS Number	14024-18-1
3D model (JSmol)	Interactive image
ChemSpider	4588230
ECHA InfoCard	100.034.398
EC Number	237-853-5
PubChem CID	139087805
UNII	118BHF260P
CompTox Dashboard (EPA)	DTXSID3051707
- InChI: InChI=1S/3C5H8O2.Fe/c3*1-4(6)3-5(2)7;/h3*3,6H,1-2H3;/q;;;+3/p-3/b3*4-3-; Key: AQBLLJNPHDIAPN-LNTINUHCSA-K
- SMILES: CC(=C[C-](C)O1)O[Fe+3]123(OC(=C[C-](C)O2)C)OC(=C[C-](C)O3)C

Properties
Chemical formula	Fe(C_{5}H_{7}O_{2})_{3}
Molar mass	353.17 g/mol
Appearance	Red Solid
Density	1.348 g/cm^{3}
Melting point	180 to 181 °C (356 to 358 °F; 453 to 454 K)
Boiling point	decomposes
Solubility in water	2 g/L

Hazards
- GHS labelling
Pictograms	(GHS05: Corrosive) (GHS07: Exclamation mark)
Signal word	Danger
Hazard statements	H302+H312+H332, H318
Precautionary statements	P261, P280, P301+P312, P302+P352+P312, P304+P340+P312, P305+P351+P338
- Except where otherwise noted, data are given for materials in their standard state (at 25 °C [77 °F], 100 kPa). verify (what is ?) Infobox references

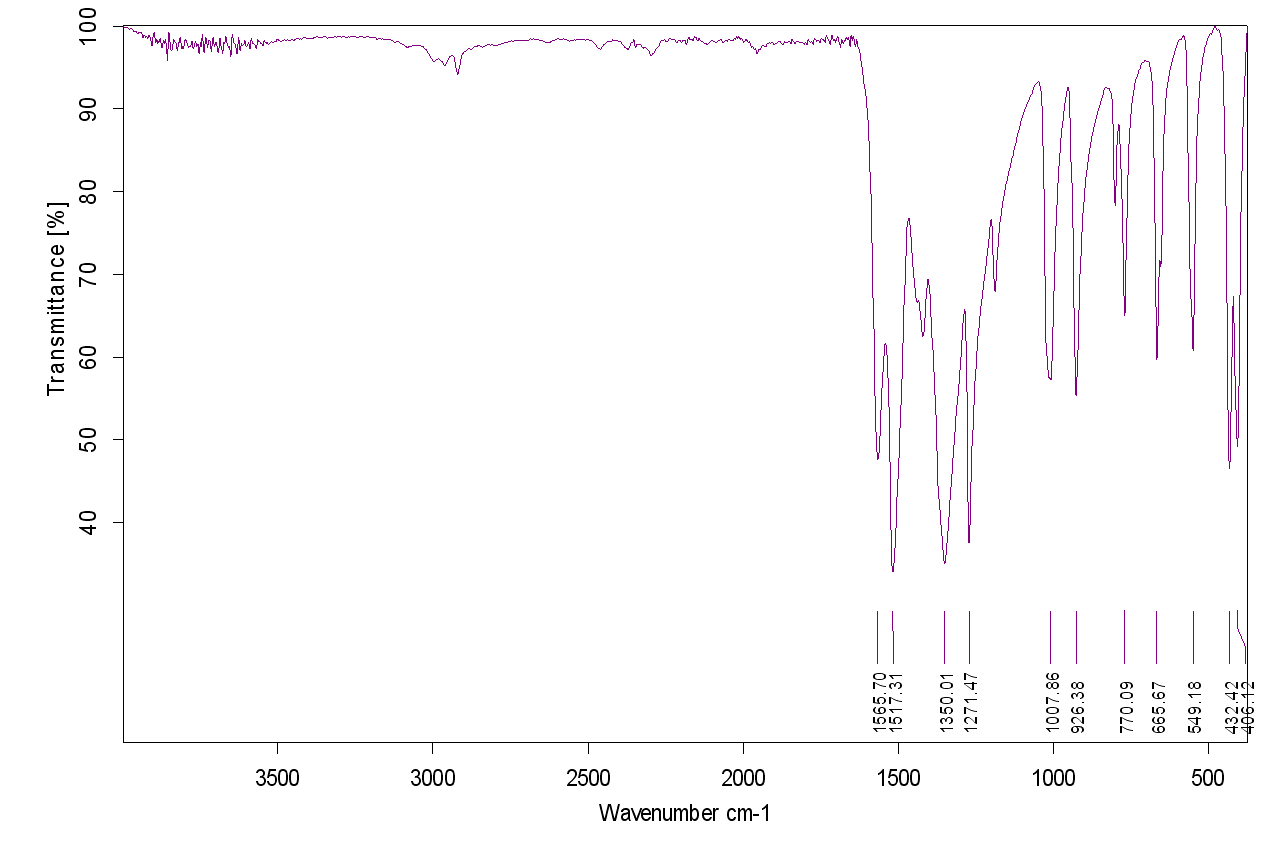
Infrared spectrum of Tris(acetylacetonato)iron(III)

Tris(acetylacetonato)iron(III), often abbreviated Fe(acac)_{3}, is a ferric coordination complex featuring acetylacetonate (acac) ligands, making it one of a family of metal acetylacetonates. It is a red air-stable solid that dissolves in nonpolar organic solvents.

== Preparation ==
Fe(acac)_{3} is prepared by treating freshly precipitated Fe(OH)_{3} with acetylacetone.

Fe(OH)_{3} + 3 HC_{5}H_{7}O_{2} → Fe(C_{5}H_{7}O_{2})_{3} + 3 H_{2}O

== Structure and properties ==
Fe(acac)_{3} is an octahedral complex with six equivalent Fe-O bonds with bond distances of about 2.00 Å. The regular geometry is consistent with a high-spin Fe^{3+} core. As the metal orbitals are all evenly occupied, the complex is not subject to Jahn–Teller distortions and thus adopts a D_{3} molecular symmetry. In contrast, the related metal acetylacetonate Mn(acac)_{3} adopts a more distorted octahedral structure. The 5 unpaired d-electrons also result in the complex being paramagnetic, with a magnetic moment of 5.90 μ_{B}.

Fe(acac)_{3} possesses helical chirality. The Δ- and Λ-enantiomers slowly inter-convert via Bailar and Ray–Dutt twists. The rate of interconversion is sufficiently slow to allow its enantiomers to be partially resolved. In diethyl ether solution, at ambient temperature, the half-life of racemisation is 3.3 minutes.

== Reactions ==
Fe(acac)_{3} has been examined as a precatalyst and reagent in organic chemistry, although the active iron-containing species is usually unidentified in these processes. In one instance, Fe(acac)_{3} was shown to promote cross-coupling a diene to an olefin. Fe(acac)_{3} catalyzes the dimerization of isoprene to a mixture of 1,5-dimethyl-1,5-cyclooctadiene and 2,5-dimethyl-1,5-cyclooctadiene.

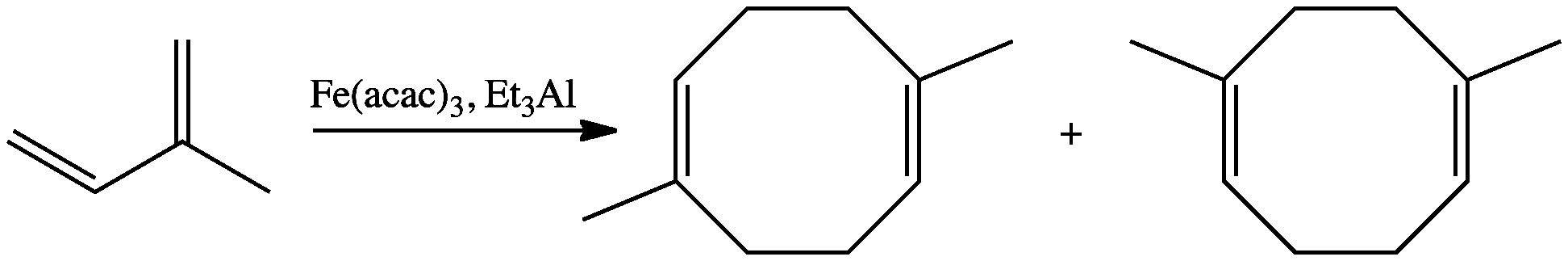

Fe(acac)_{3} also catalyzes the ring-opening polymerization of 1,3-benzoxazine. Beyond the area of polymerization, Fe(acac)_{3} has been found to catalyze the reaction of N-sulfonyl oxaziridines with olefins to form 1,3-oxazolidine products.

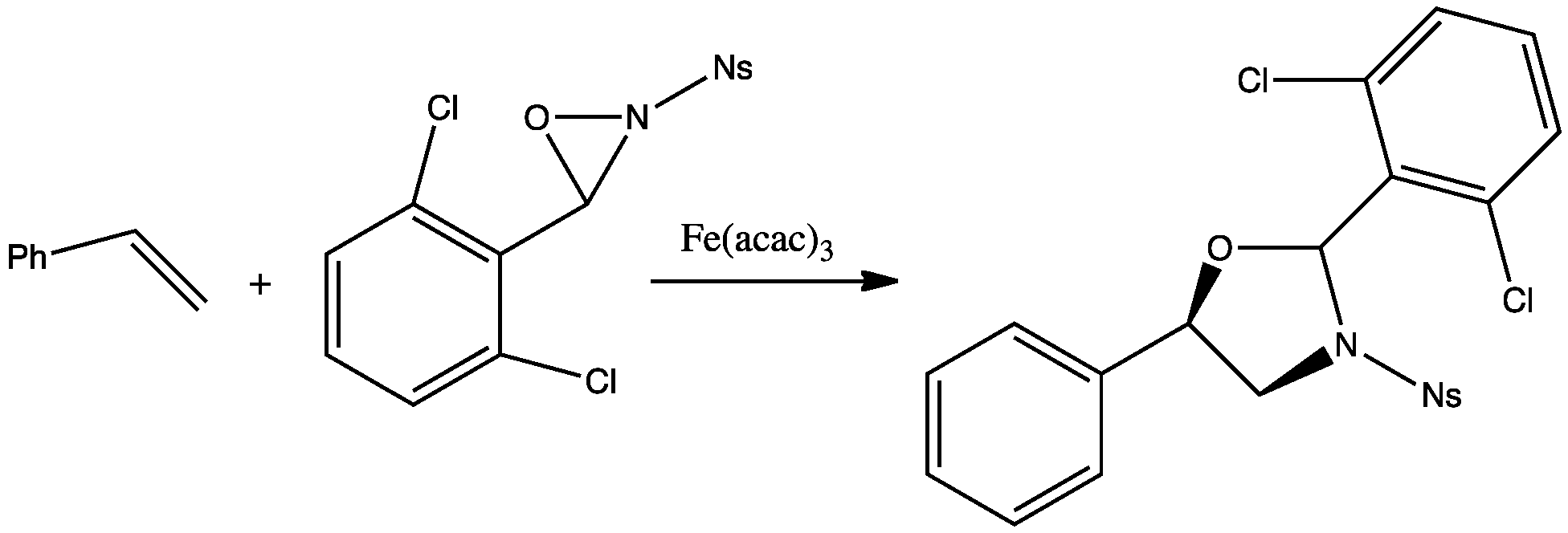
