= Iodine heptafluoride =

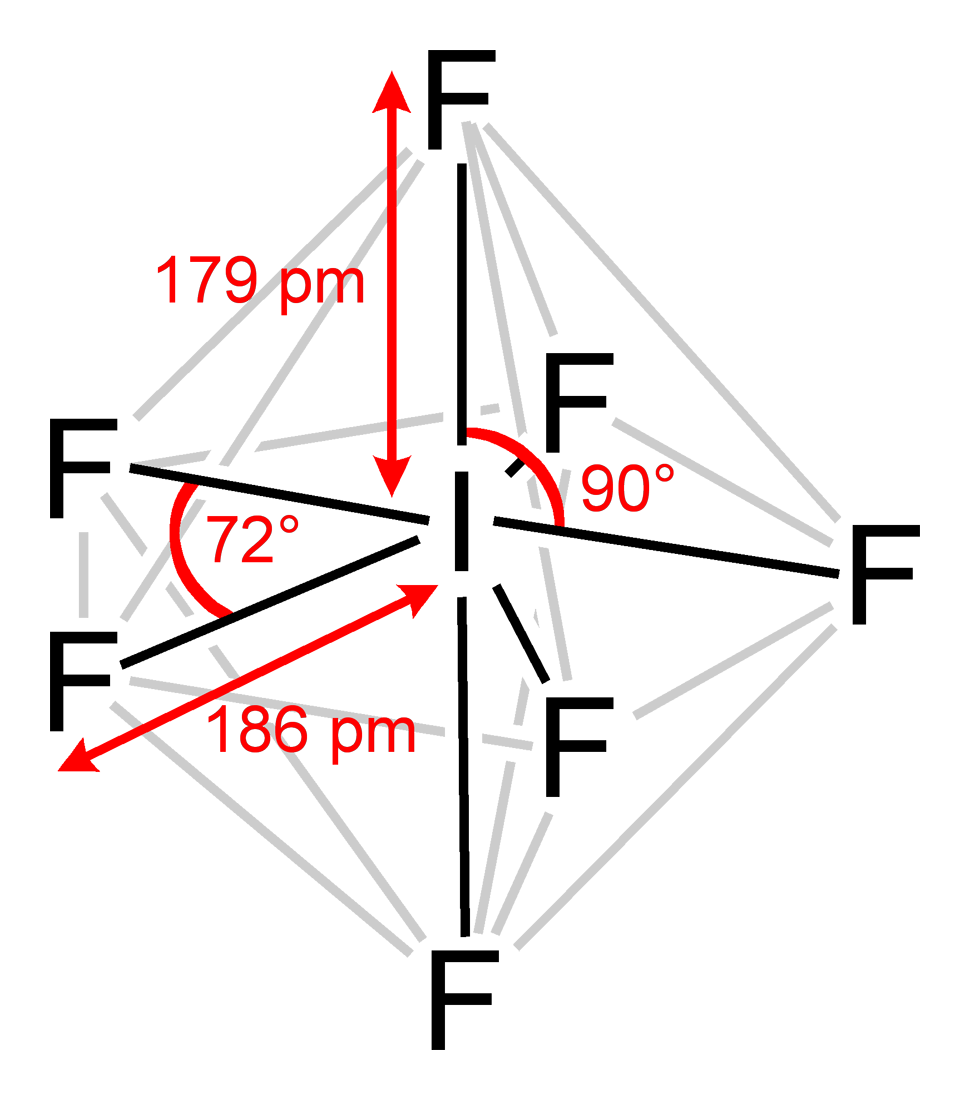
- Structure of iodine heptafluoride(IF7)

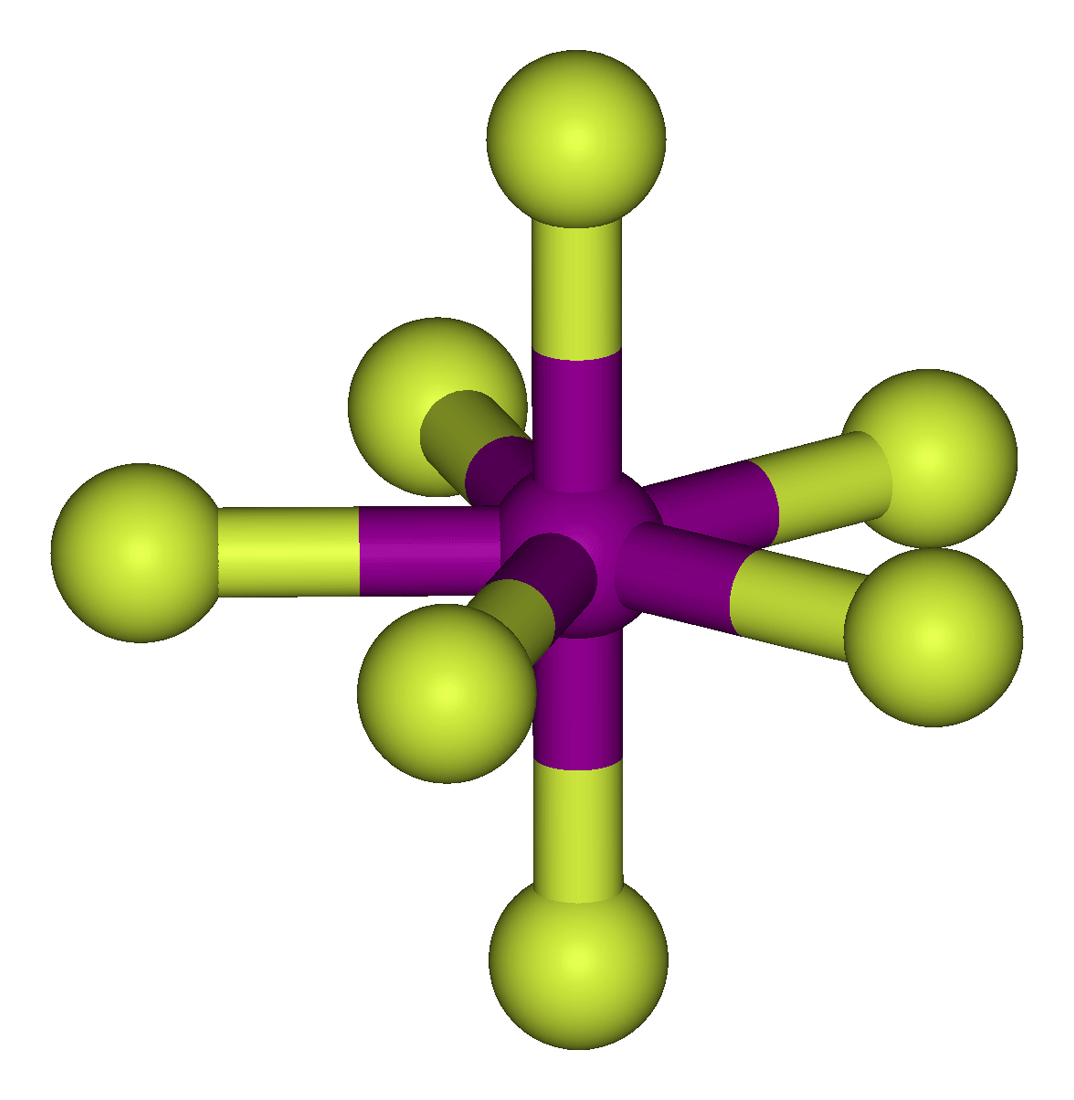
Iodine heptafluoride
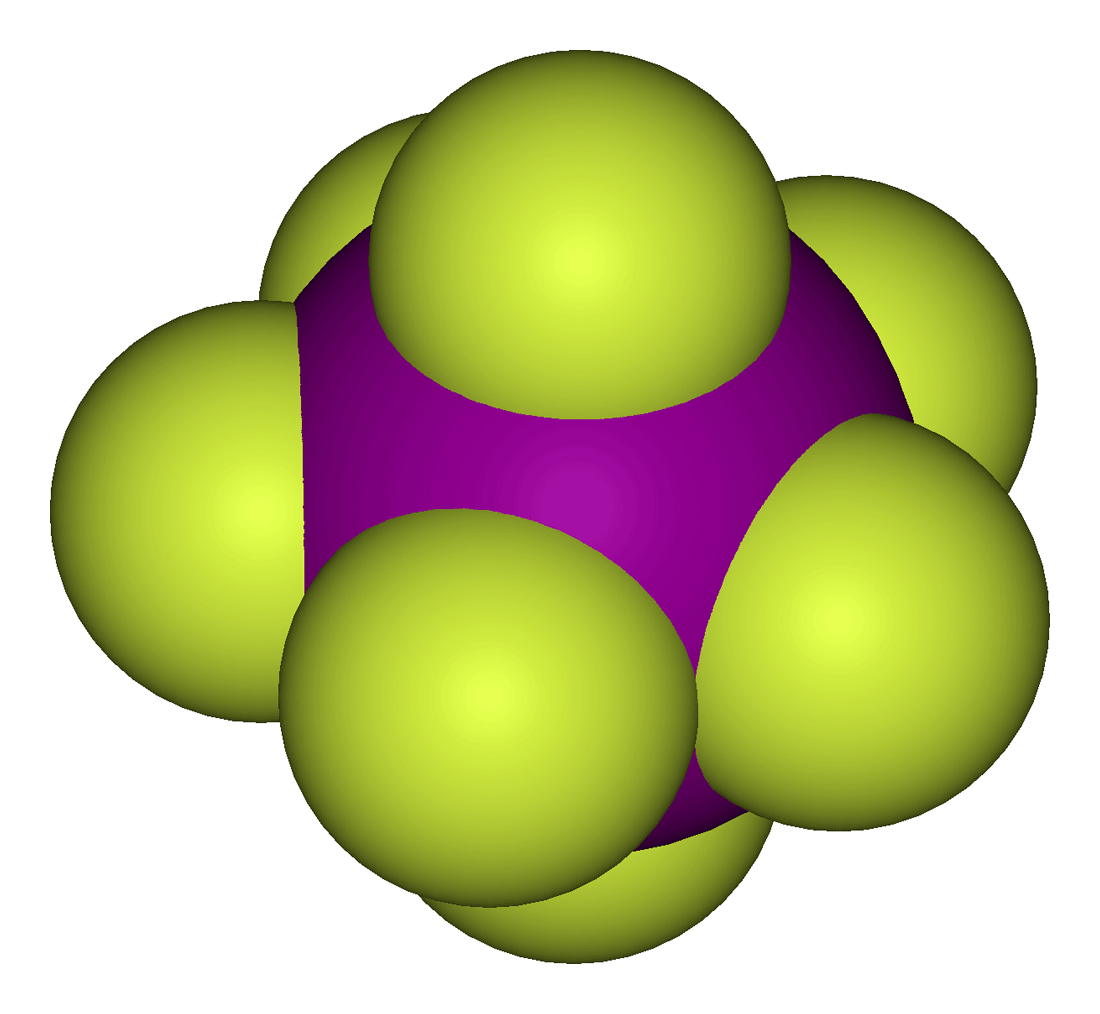
Iodine heptafluoride

Names
- Other names Iodine(VII) fluoride Heptafluoroiodine

Identifiers
CAS Number	16921-96-3
3D model (JSmol)	Interactive image
ChemSpider	21477354
ECHA InfoCard	100.037.241
PubChem CID	85645
UNII	M080M03ILM
CompTox Dashboard (EPA)	DTXSID8066133
- InChI: InChI=1S/F7I/c1-8(2,3,4,5,6)7 Key: XRURPHMPXJDCOO-UHFFFAOYSA-N; InChI=1/F7I/c1-8(2,3,4,5,6)7 Key: XRURPHMPXJDCOO-UHFFFAOYAO
- SMILES: FI(F)(F)(F)(F)(F)F

Properties
Chemical formula	IF_{7}
Molar mass	259.90 g/mol
Appearance	colorless gas
Density	2.6 g/cm^{3} (6 °C); 2.7 g/cm^{3} (25 °C)
Melting point	4.5 °C (40.1 °F; 277.6 K) (triple point)
Boiling point	4.8 °C (40.6 °F; 277.9 K) (sublimes at 1 atm)
Solubility in water	soluble

Related compounds
Related compounds	iodine pentafluoride
- Except where otherwise noted, data are given for materials in their standard state (at 25 °C [77 °F], 100 kPa). verify (what is ?) Infobox references

Iodine heptafluoride is an interhalogen compound with the chemical formula IF_{7}. It has an unusual pentagonal bipyramidal structure, with D_{5h} symmetry, as predicted by VSEPR theory. The molecule can undergo a pseudorotational rearrangement called the Bartell mechanism, which is like the Berry mechanism but for a heptacoordinated system.

Below 4.5 °C, IF_{7} forms a snow-white powder of colorless crystals, melting at 5–6 °C. However, this melting is difficult to observe, as the liquid form is thermodynamically unstable at 760 mmHg: instead, the compound begins to sublime at 4.77 °C. The dense vapor has a mouldy, acrid odour.

== Preparation ==
IF_{7} is prepared by passing F_{2} through liquid IF_{5} at 90 °C, then heating the vapours to 270 °C. Alternatively, this compound can be prepared from fluorine and dried palladium or potassium iodide to minimize the formation of IOF_{5}, an impurity arising by hydrolysis. Iodine heptafluoride is also produced as a by-product when dioxygenyl hexafluoroplatinate is used to prepare other platinum(V) compounds such as potassium hexafluoroplatinate(V), using potassium fluoride in iodine pentafluoride solution:

2 O_{2}PtF_{6} + 2 KF + IF_{5} → 2 KPtF_{6} + 2 O_{2} + IF_{7}

== Reactions ==
Iodine heptafluoride decomposes at 200 °C to fluorine gas and iodine pentafluoride.

== Safety considerations ==
IF_{7} is highly irritating to both the skin and the mucous membranes. It also is a strong oxidizer and can cause fire on contact with organic material.
