= Van der Waals strain =

Steric hindrance between substituents

Van der Waals strain is strain resulting from Van der Waals repulsion when two substituents in a molecule approach each other with a distance less than the sum of their Van der Waals radii. Van der Waals strain is also called Van der Waals repulsion and is related to steric hindrance. One of the most common forms of this strain is eclipsing hydrogen, in alkanes.

== In rotational and pseudorotational mechanisms ==
In molecules whose vibrational mode involves a rotational or pseudorotational mechanism (such as the Berry mechanism or the Bartell mechanism), Van der Waals strain can cause significant differences in potential energy, even between molecules with identical geometry. PF_{5}, for example, has significantly lower potential energy than PCl_{5}. Despite their identical trigonal bipyramidal molecular geometry, the higher electron count of chlorine as compared to fluorine causes a potential energy spike as the molecule enters its intermediate in the mechanism and the substituents draw nearer to each other.

== See also ==
- Van der Waals force
- Van der Waals molecule
- Van der Waals radius
- Van der Waals surface
