= Ring flip =

Process in organic chemistry

The conformer of methylcyclohexane with equatorial methyl is favored by 1.74 kcal/mol (7.3 kJ/mol) relative to the conformer where methyl is axial.

In organic chemistry, a ring flip (also known as a ring inversion or ring reversal) is the interconversion of cyclic conformers that have equivalent ring shapes (e.g., from a chair conformer to another chair conformer) that results in the exchange of nonequivalent substituent positions. The overall process generally takes place over several steps, involving coupled rotations about several of the molecule's single bonds, in conjunction with minor deformations of bond angles. Most commonly, the term is used to refer to the interconversion of the two chair conformers of cyclohexane derivatives, which is specifically referred to as a chair flip, although other cycloalkanes and inorganic rings undergo similar processes.

== Chair flip ==
As stated above, a chair flip is a ring inversion specifically of cyclohexane (and its derivatives) from one chair conformer to another, often to reduce steric strain. The term, "flip" is misleading, because the direction of each carbon remains the same; what changes is the orientation. A conformation is a unique structural arrangement of atoms, in particular one achieved through the rotation of single bonds. A conformer is a conformational isomer, a blend of the two words.

=== Cyclohexane ===
There exist many different conformations for cyclohexane, such as chair, boat, and twist-boat, but the chair conformation is the most commonly observed state for cyclohexanes because it requires the least amount of energy. The chair conformation minimizes both angle strain and torsional strain by having all carbon-carbon bonds at 110.9° and all hydrogens staggered from one another.

The conformational changes that occur in a cyclohexane ring flip take place over several stages. Structure D (10.8 kcal/mol) is the highest energy transition state of the process.

The molecular motions involved in a chair flip are detailed in the figure on the right: The half-chair conformation (D, 10.8 kcal/mol, C_{2} symmetry) is the energy maximum when proceeding from the chair conformer (A, 0 kcal/mol reference, D_{3d} symmetry) to the higher energy twist-boat conformer (B, 5.5 kcal/mol, D_{2} symmetry). The boat conformation (C, 6.9 kcal/mol, C_{2v} symmetry) is a local energy maximum for the interconversion of the two mirror image twist-boat conformers, the second of which is converted to the other chair confirmation through another half-chair. At the end of the process, all axial positions have become equatorial and vice versa. The overall barrier of 10.8 kcal/mol corresponds to a rate constant of about 10^{5} s^{–1} at room temperature.

Note that the twist-boat (D_{2}) conformer and the half-chair (C_{2}) transition state are in chiral point groups and are therefore chiral molecules. In the figure, the two depictions of B and two depictions of D are pairs of enantiomers.

As a consequence of the chair flip, the axially-substituted and equatorially-substituted conformers of a molecule like chlorocyclohexane cannot be isolated at room temperature. However, in some cases, the isolation of individual conformers of substituted cyclohexane derivatives has been achieved at low temperatures (–150 °C).

=== Axial and equatorial positions ===
As noted above, by transitioning from one chair conformer to another, all axial positions become equatorial and all equatorial positions become axial. Substituent groups in equatorial positions roughly follow along the equator of the cyclohexane ring and are perpendicular to the axis, while substituents in axial positions roughly follow the imaginary axis of the carbon ring and are perpendicular to the equator.

Diaxial interactions or axial-axial interactions is what the steric strain between an axial substituent and another axial group, typically a hydrogen, on the same side of a chair conformation ring. The interaction is labeled by the carbon number they come from. A 1,3-diaxial interaction happens between the atoms connected to the first and third carbons. The more interactions the more strain on the molecule and the conformations with the most strain are less likely to be seen. An example is cyclopropane which, because of its planar geometry, has six fully eclipsed carbon and axial hydrogen bonds making the strain 116 kJ/mol (27.7 kcal/mol). Strain can also be decreased when the carbon-carbon bond angles are close or at the preferred bond angle of 109.5°, meaning a ring having six tetrahedral carbons is typically lower than that of most rings.

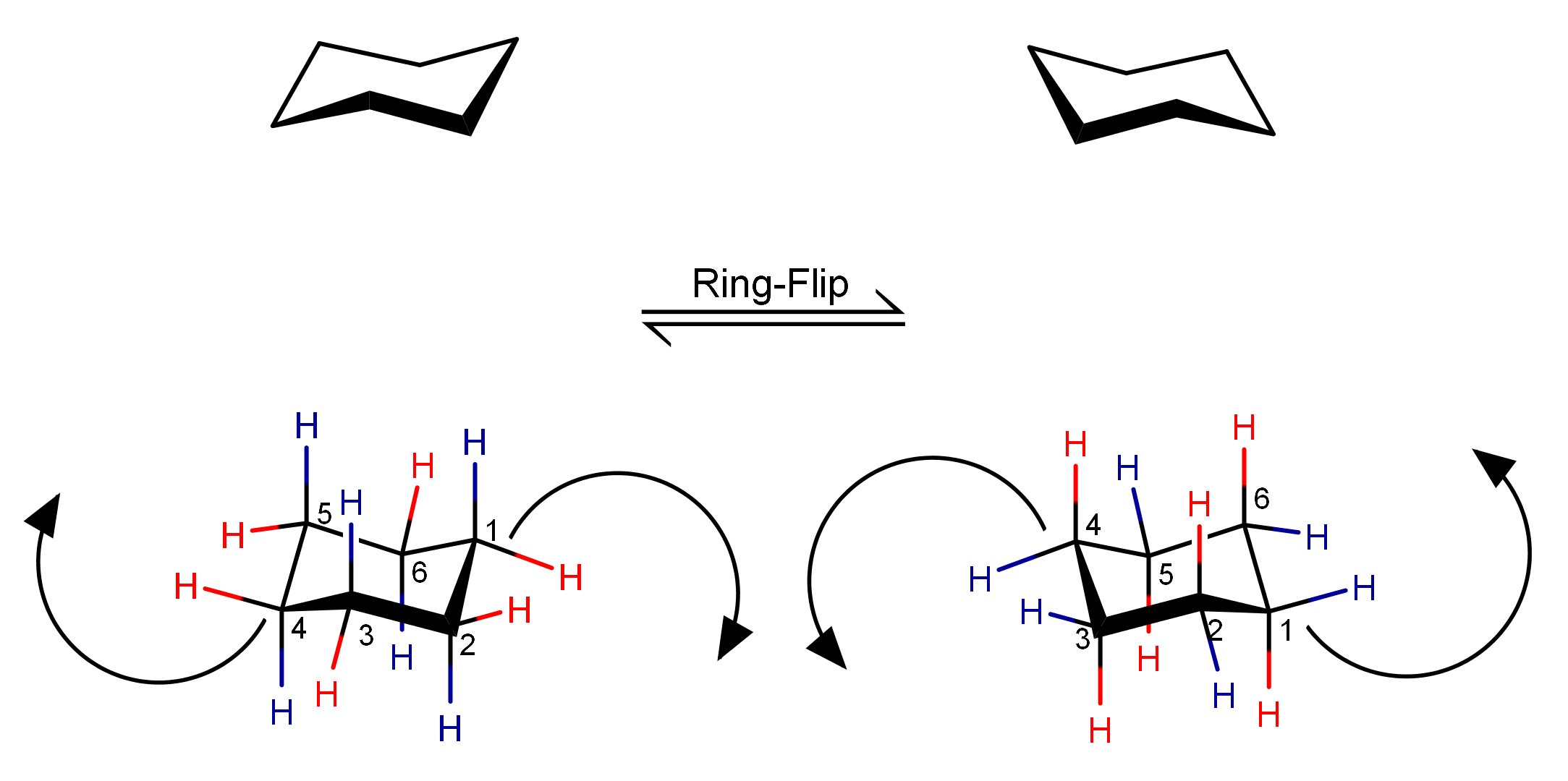
Numbered six carbon ring demonstrating the changes made axially and equatorially when a ring is "flipped."In the left side representation, red hydrogens are equatorial, then become axial upon ring flip.

== Examples ==
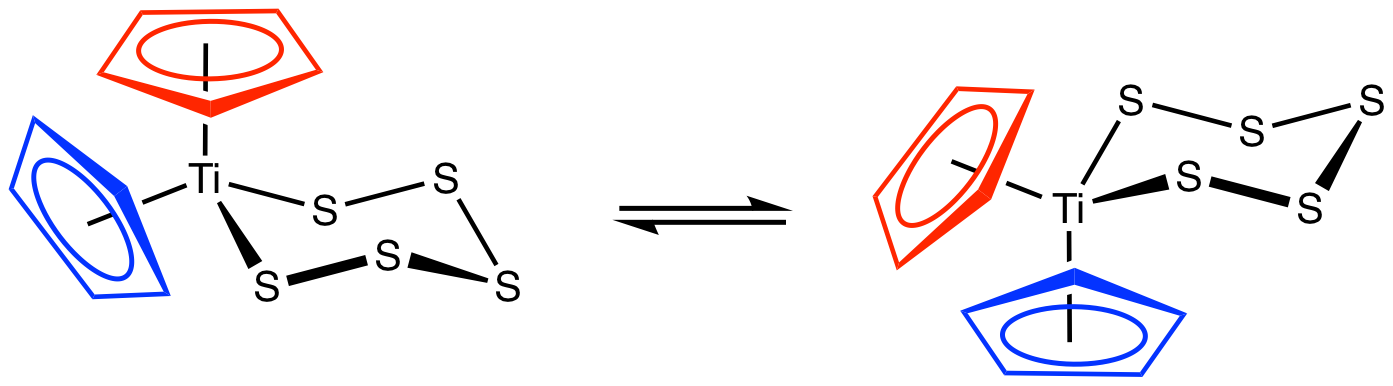
The ^{1}H NMR spectrum of titanocene pentasulfide features two signals at room temperature, a consequence of its relative rigidity.

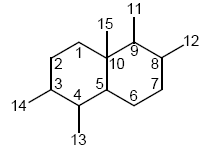
Bicycloalkane with two "bridgehead carbons"

Cyclohexane is a prototype for low-energy degenerate ring flipping. Two ^{1}H NMR signals should be observed in principle, corresponding to axial and equatorial protons. However, due to the cyclohexane chair flip, only one signal is seen for a solution of cyclohexane at room temperature, as the axial and equatorial proton rapidly interconvert relative to the NMR time scale. The coalescence temperature at 60 MHz is ca. –60 °C. As a consequence of the chair flip, the axially-substituted and equatorially-substituted conformers of a molecule like chlorocyclohexane cannot be isolated at room temperature.

However, in some cases, the isolation of individual conformers of substituted cyclohexane derivatives has been achieved at low temperatures (–150 °C).

Most compounds with nonplanar rings engage in degenerate ring flipping. One well-studied example is titanocene pentasulfide, where the inversion barrier is high relative to cyclohexane's. Hexamethylcyclotrisiloxane on the other hand is subject to a very low barrier.

Bicycloalkanes are alkanes containing two rings that are connected to each other by sharing two carbon atoms. Orientation within bicycloalkanes is dependent on the cis or trans orientation of the hydrogen shared by the different rings instead of the methyl groups present in the rings.

Tetrodotoxin is one of the world's most potent toxins. It is made up of multiple six member rings set in chair conformations, with each ring but one containing an atom other than carbon.

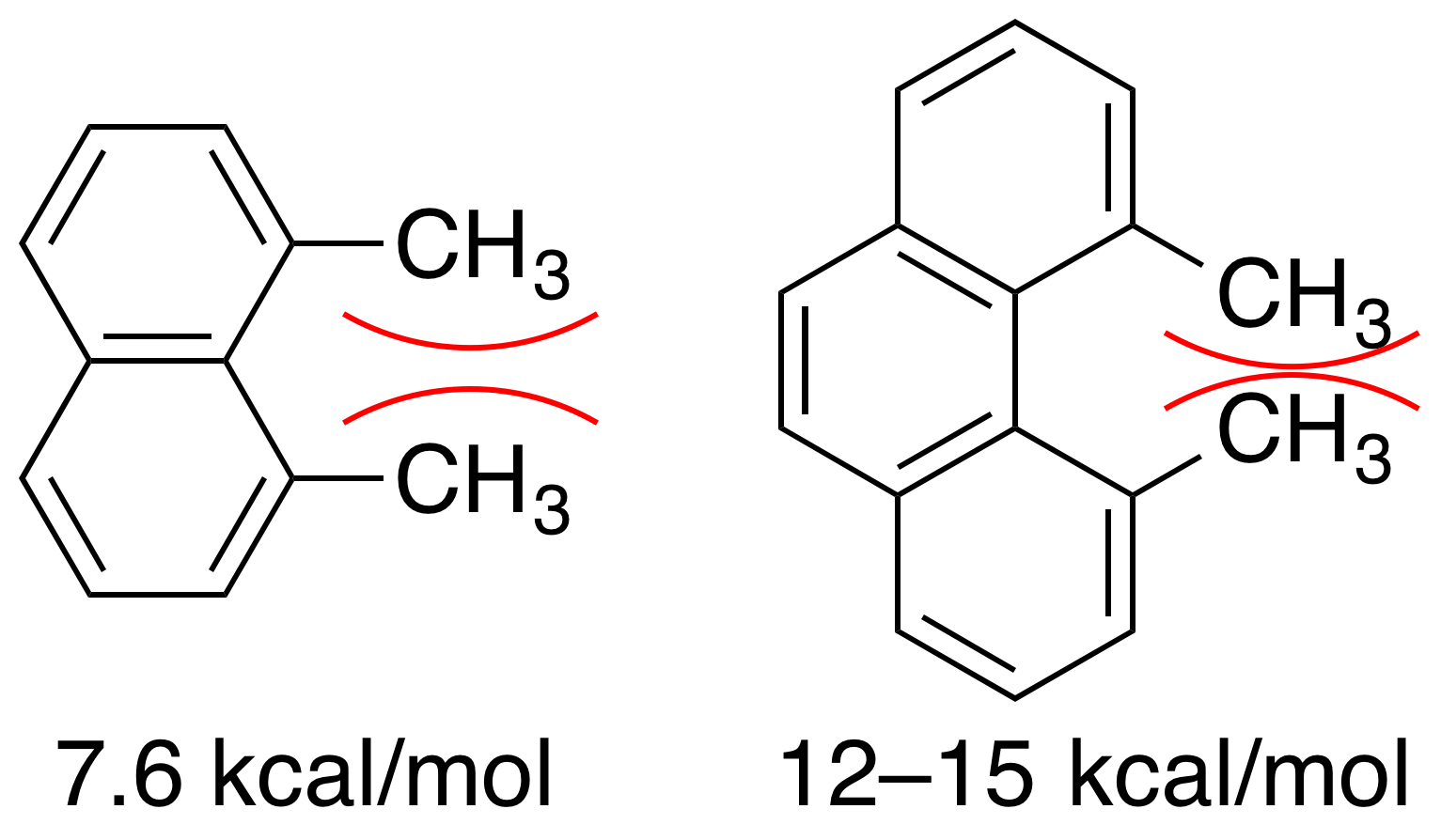
Skeletal structures of 1,8-dimethylnaphthalene and 4,5-dimethylphenanthrene annotated with the steric effects between the two methyl groups.

== See also ==
- Cyclohexane conformation
- Conformational isomerism
