= Scandium acetylacetonate =

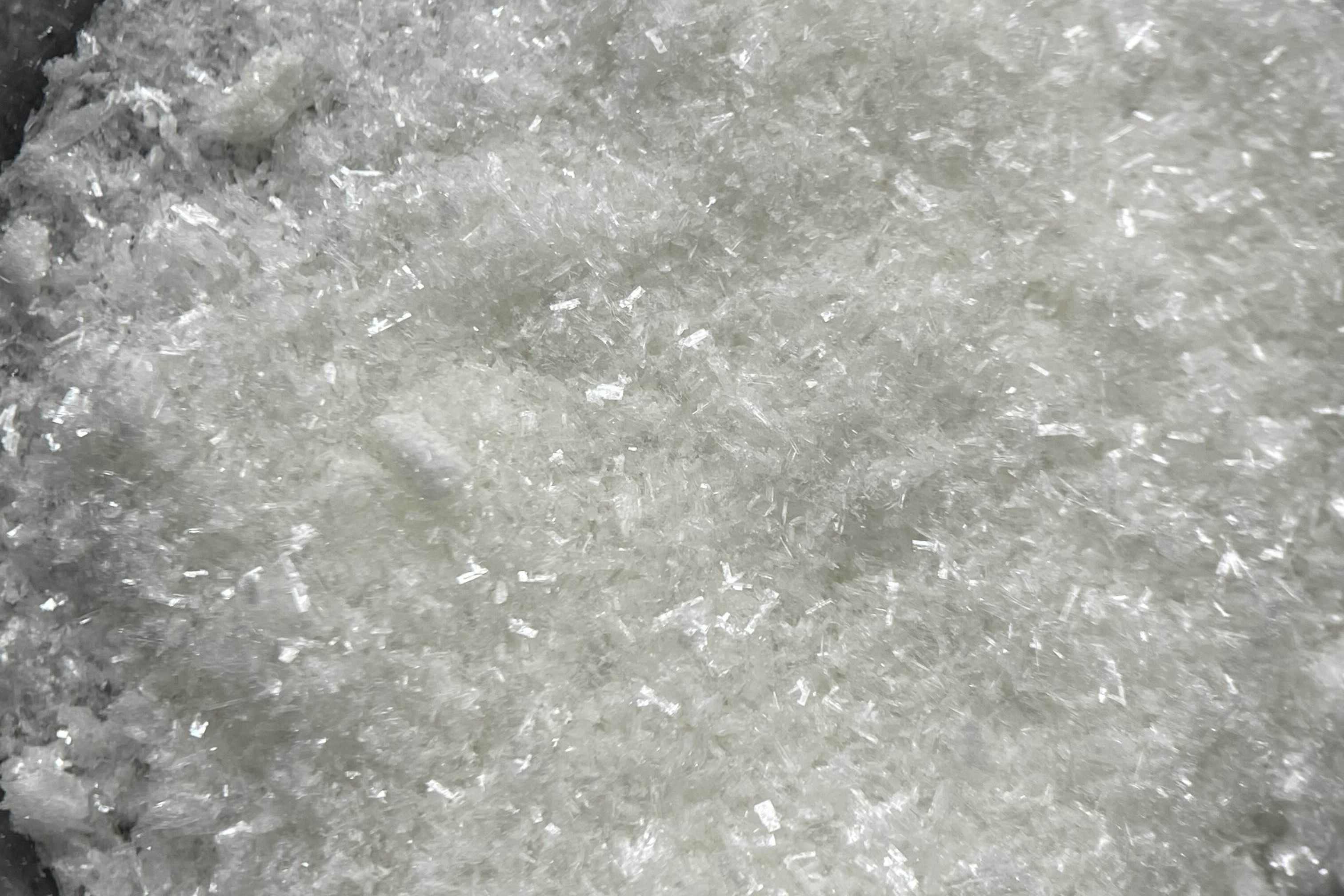

Names
- IUPAC name Tris(acetylacetonato)scandium(III)
- Systematic IUPAC name Tris[(Z)-4-oxopent-2-en-2-olato-κ^{2}O,O′]scandium(III)
- Other names tris(acetylacetonate)scandium, scandium tris(acetylacetonate)

Identifiers
CAS Number	14284-94-7 anhydrous; monohydrate: 124302-45-0
3D model (JSmol)	Interactive image
ChemSpider	57493283
PubChem CID	131873666
- InChI: InChI=1S/3C5H7O2.Sc/c3*1-4(6)3-5(2)7;/h3*3H,1-2H3;/q3*-1;+3 Key: NYPXMGRKLWIPFL-UHFFFAOYSA-N
- SMILES: CC1=O[Sc+3]23(O=C(C)[CH-]C(C)=O2)(O=C(C)[CH-]C(C)=O3)O=C(C)[CH-]1

Properties
Chemical formula	C_{15}H_{21}O_{6}Sc
Molar mass	342.283 g·mol^{−1}
Appearance	white solid
Density	1.385 g/cm^{3}
Melting point	187 sublimes
- Except where otherwise noted, data are given for materials in their standard state (at 25 °C [77 °F], 100 kPa). Infobox references

Scandium acetylacetonate is the coordination complex with the formula Sc(C_{5}H_{7}O_{2})_{3} where [C_{5}H_{7}O_{2}]^{−} refers to acetylacetonate. It is a volatile white solid that is soluble in benzene. The complex features Sc(III) with octahedral molecular geometry. It was first prepared by treating scandium nitrate with acetylacetone in the presence of ammonia.
