= Priyadaranjan Ray =

Indian inorganic chemist and historian of chemistry

- Born: 16 January 1888; Noāpāra, Chittagong District, Bengal Presidency, British Raj (now Chattogram District, Bangladesh)
- Died: 11 December 1982 (aged 94); Kolkata, West Bengal, India
- Education: Presidency College; University of Calcutta
- Known for: Ray–Dutt twist
- Scientific career
- Fields: Inorganic chemistry; History of chemistry
- Workplaces: University of Calcutta

Priyadaranjan Ray FNA, FIAS (16 January 1888 – 11 December 1982) was an Indian inorganic chemist and historian of chemistry noted for proposing the Ray-Dutt twist mechanism.

== Life and career ==
Ray was born in Chittagong District, Bengal Presidency (now in Bangladesh) to a zamindar family originally from Hooghly district (now in West Bengal), which had first migrated to the princely state of Tripura in the late 17th century, and had subsequently entered the service of the Nawabs of Bengal. The family were granted the estate of Noapara in the early 18th century by Nawab Murshid Quli Khan, the first Nawab of Bengal. After matriculating with distinction from the Chittagong Collegiate School in 1904, Ray secured a scholarship to the Chittagong Government College and in 1906 joined the Presidency College Calcutta as an undergraduate. He secured an honours degree in chemistry and physics in 1908, and then studied under Prafulla Chandra Ray for his master's degree, which he secured with the highest honours in 1911.

In 1911, Ray began work under P. C. Ray as a senior research scholar in inorganic chemistry. He began a research project on the formation of chemical complexes between Copper(I) thiocyanate and potassium thiocyanate, but on 12 August 1912, he was severely injured in an explosion when potassium thiocyanate reacted with hot sulfuric acid; the accident left him completely blind in his left eye and deprived him of most of the sight in his right. After two years of recuperation, he joined the City College, Kolkata as a chemistry professor. In 1919, he was appointed assistant professor of inorganic chemistry in the University Science College (now the Rajabazar Science College) of the University of Kolkata, where he remained until his retirement in 1952, being appointed Khaira Professor of Chemistry in 1937 and Palit Research Professor of Chemistry in 1946. Apart from a trip to Europe in 1929–1930, where he worked with Fritz Ephraim and Frederic Emich and underwent surgery to improve his remaining vision, he never left India.

Ray was a founding fellow of the Indian Chemical Society in 1924, serving as its president in 1947–1948. From 1945 to 1953, he served as the Honorary Director (Honorary Secretary until 1947) of the Indian Association for the Cultivation of Science (IACS), and again as its officiating Director from 1956 until 1958, when he largely retired from scientific research, having supervised a number of doctorates. In 1951, in recognition of his accomplishments in microchemistry and colorimetry, he was appointed a member of a IUPAC Commission of New Reactions and served for eight years, during which time he contributed towards a comprehensive review of colorimetric analysis. In 1979, he was appointed President of the 20th International Conference on Coordination Chemistry.

A bachelor, Ray lived simply and remained indifferent towards academic honours and distinctions throughout his life, never aspiring to a doctorate despite a record of accomplishments which would have qualified him for one. In 1935, he was appointed a Foundation Fellow of the National Institute of Sciences of India (FNI, now the Indian National Science Academy). (Note: Prior to 1970, the Indian National Science Academy was named the "National Institute of Sciences of India", and its fellows bore the post-nominal "FNI". The post-nominal became "FNA" in 1970 when the association adopted its present name.) In 1944, he was further appointed a Fellow of the Indian Association for the Cultivation of Science (FIAS). Completely blind and deaf in his final years, he died on 11 December 1982 after a period of failing health, aged 94.

== Scientific and historical studies ==
During his career, Ray conducted research in coordination chemistry and magnetochemistry. He designed several organic reagents including rubeanic acid, bismuthiol-I and biguanide for detecting and estimating metal ions with volumetric, gravimetric and spectrophotometric methods. A great deal of his work concerned the chemistry of the biguanide ligand, in connection with which he discovered its third- and fourth-order inner metallic complexes and proposed the rhombic-tetragonal Ray-Dutt twist mechanism with his colleague Nihar Kumar Dutt; the mechanism was intended to explain the racemization of tris(BigH)cobalt(III) ion, [Co(BigH)3]3+. Ray also conducted research into the higher oxidation states of metals and the polyhalogen compounds of hydrogen. Also a noted historian of Indian science, Ray published and edited a number of works on popular science and the history of Indian chemistry in both English and Bengali; after his retirement from the IACS in 1958, he continued to conduct and direct historical research as a supervisor of the History of Science Section of the Indian National Science Academy.

== Global policy ==
He was one of the signatories of the agreement to convene a convention for drafting a world constitution. As a result, for the first time in human history, a World Constituent Assembly convened to draft and adopt the Constitution for the Federation of Earth.
