= Pseudorotation =

Movement of molecular ligands into a conformation indistinguishable from the original

In chemistry, a pseudorotation is a set of intramolecular movements of attached groups (i.e., ligands) on a highly symmetric molecule, leading to a molecule indistinguishable from the initial one. The International Union of Pure and Applied Chemistry (IUPAC) defines a pseudorotation as a "stereoisomerization resulting in a structure that appears to have been produced by rotation of the entire initial molecule", the result of which is a "product" that is "superposable on the initial one, unless different positions are distinguished by substitution, including isotopic substitution".

Well-known examples are the intramolecular isomerization of trigonal bipyramidal compounds by the Berry pseudorotation mechanism, and the out-of-plane motions of carbon atoms exhibited by cyclopentane, leading to the interconversions it experiences between its many possible conformers (envelope, twist). Note that no angular momentum is generated by this motion: otherwise a macroscopic sample would heat-up by itself, as an additional angular momentum would increase the population of certain rotational states which would increase the overall thermal energy, comparable to heating in a microwave oven. As this is not observed and would also create a perpetuum mobile of first kind, there can be no angular momentum change involved. In these and related examples, a small displacement of the atomic positions leads to a loss of symmetry until the symmetric product re-forms (see image example below), where these displacements are typically along low-energy pathways. The Berry mechanism refers to the facile interconversion of axial and equatorial ligand in MX_{5} types of compounds, e.g. D_{3h}-symmetric PF_{5} (shown). Finally, in a formal sense, the term pseudorotation is intended to refer exclusively to dynamics in symmetrical molecules, though mechanisms of the same type are invoked for lower symmetry molecules as well (otherwise stereoisomers would be observable for the affected compound if it is “asymmetrical enough”).

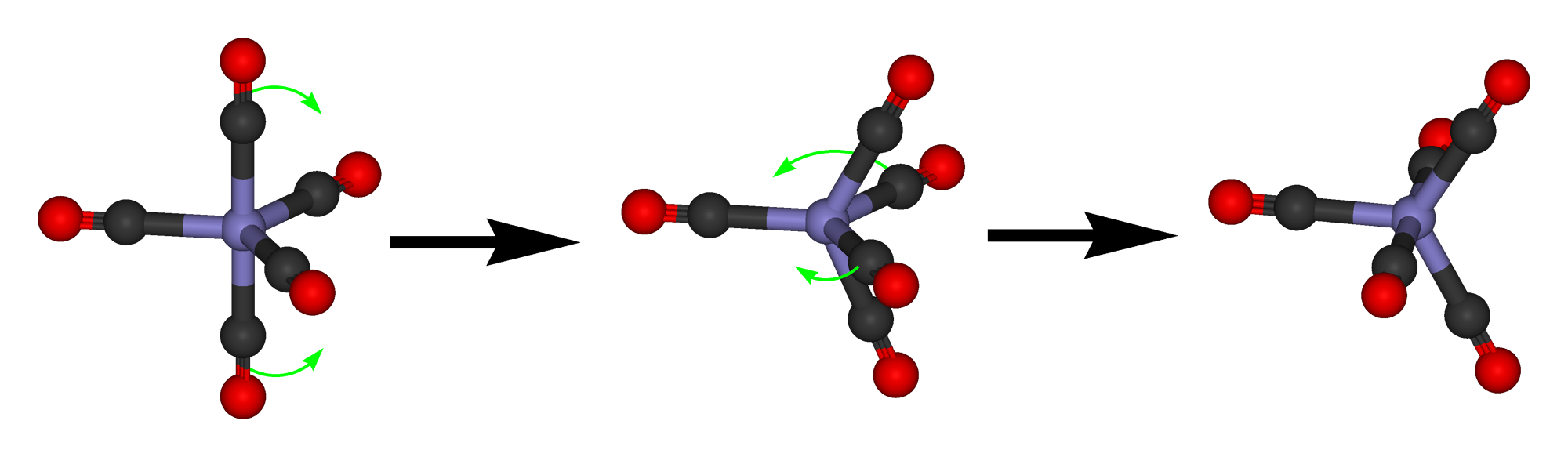
Pseudorotation of iron–pentacarbonyl complex (Berry mechanism)

== See also ==
- Bailar twist
- Ray–Dutt twist
- Bartell mechanism
- Fluxional molecule
