= Fluxional molecule =

Molecules whose atoms interchange between symmetric positions

Fluxional (or non-rigid) molecules are molecules that undergo dynamics such that some or all of their nuclei interchange, or tunnel, between symmetrically equivalent positions. Because virtually all molecules are fluxional at some time scale, the term fluxional depends on the method used to assess the dynamics. A molecule is considered to be fluxional if its spectroscopic signature exhibits line-splitting, or line-broadening beyond that dictated by the Heisenberg uncertainty principle. When such is not observed to occur, the molecule is said to be semi-rigid. Longuet-Higgins introduced the use of permutation-inversion groups for the symmetry classification of the states of fluxional (or non-rigid) molecules.

A well-studied fluxional molecule is the methanium ion (protonated methane) CH^{+}_{5}. In this unusual species, whose IR spectrum has been experimentally observed and theoretically studied, the barriers to proton exchange are extremely low. On the other hand, the parent molecule CH_{4}, methane, is semi-rigid.

== Spectroscopic studies ==
Many organometallic compounds exhibit fluxionality. Fluxionality is, however, pervasive.

=== NMR spectroscopy ===
Temperature dependent changes in the NMR spectra result from dynamics associated with the fluxional molecules when those dynamics proceed at rates comparable to the frequency differences observed by NMR. The experiment is called DNMR and typically involves recording spectra at various temperatures. In the ideal case, low temperature spectra can be assigned to the "slow exchange limit", whereas spectra recorded at higher temperatures correspond to molecules at "fast exchange limit". Typically, high temperature spectra are simpler than those recorded at low temperatures, since at high temperatures, equivalent sites are averaged out. Prior to the advent of DNMR, kinetics of reactions were measured on non-equilibrium mixtures, monitoring the approach to equilibrium.

Many molecular processes exhibit fluxionality that can be probed on the NMR time scale. Beyond the examples highlighted below, other classic examples include the Cope rearrangement in bullvalene and the chair inversion in cyclohexane.

For processes that are too slow for traditional DNMR analysis, the technique spin saturation transfer (SST, also called EXSY for exchange spectroscopy) is applicable. This magnetization transfer technique gives rate information, provided that the rates exceed 1/T_{1}.

=== IR spectroscopy ===
Although less common, some dynamics are also observable on the time-scale of IR spectroscopy. One example is electron transfer in a mixed-valence dimer of metal clusters. Application of the equation for coalescence of two signals separated by 10 cm^{−1} gives the following result:

$$k \sim \Delta \nu_0 \sim 2(10~\text{cm}^{-1}) (300 \cdot 10^8~\text{cm/s}) \sim 6 \times 10^{11}~\text{s}^{-1}.$$

Clearly, processes that induce line-broadening on the IR time-scale must be much more rapid than the cases that exchange on the NMR time scale.

== Examples ==
=== Cyclohexane and related rings ===
Cyclohexane chair flip (ring inversion) reaction via boat conformation

The interconversion of equivalent chair conformers of cyclohexane (and many other cyclic compounds) is called ring flipping. Carbon–hydrogen bonds that are axial in one configuration become equatorial in the other, and vice versa. At room temperature the two chair conformations rapidly equilibrate. The proton- and carbon-13 NMR spectra of cyclohexane show each only singlets near room temperature. At low temperatures, the singlet in the ^{1}H NMR spectrum decoalesces but the ^{13}C NMR spectrum remains unchanged.

=== Berry pseudorotation of pentacoordinate compounds ===
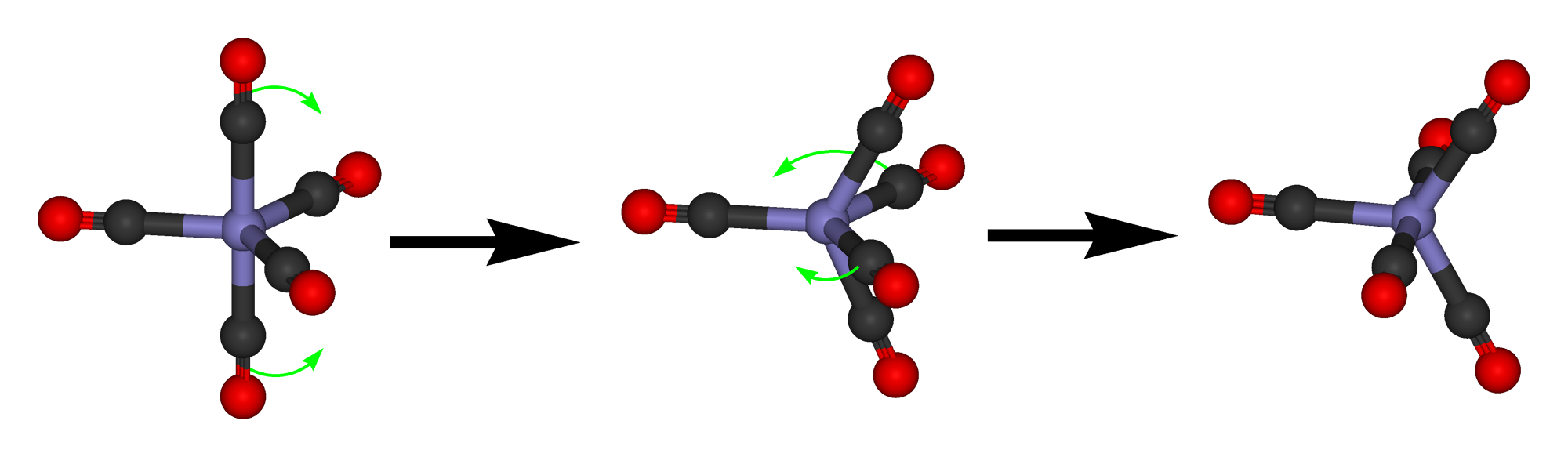
Iron-pentacarbonyl-Berry-mechanism

A prototypical fluxional molecule is phosphorus pentafluoride. Its ^{19}F NMR spectrum consists of a ^{31}P-coupled doublet, indicating that the equatorial and axial fluorine centers interchange rapidly on the NMR timescale. Fluorine-19 NMR spectroscopy, even at temperatures as low as −100 °C, fails to distinguish the axial from the equatorial fluorine environments. The apparent equivalency arises from the low barrier for pseudorotation via the Berry mechanism, by which the axial and equatorial fluorine atoms rapidly exchange positions. Iron pentacarbonyl (Fe(CO)_{5}) follows the pattern set for PF_{5}: only one signal is observed in the ^{13}C NMR spectrum near room temperature) whereas at low temperatures, two signals in a 2:3 ratio can be resolved. In sulfur tetrafluoride (SF_{4}), a similar pattern is observed even though this compound has only four ligands.

=== Six-coordinate species ===
While nonrigidity is common for pentacoordinate species, six-coordinate species typically adopt a more rigid octahedral molecular geometry, featuring close-packed array of six ligating atoms surrounding a central atom. Such compounds do rearrange intramolecularly via the Ray-Dutt twist and the Bailar twist, but the barriers for these processes are typically high such that these processes do not lead to line broadening. For some compounds, dynamics occur via dissociation of a ligand, giving a pentacoordinate intermediate, which is subject to the mechanisms discussed above. Yet another mechanism, exhibited by Fe(CO)_{4}(SiMe_{3})_{2} and related hydride complexes, is intramolecular scrambling of ligands over the faces of the tetrahedron defined by the four CO ligands.

=== Dimethylformamide ===
A classic example of a fluxional molecule is dimethylformamide (DMF).

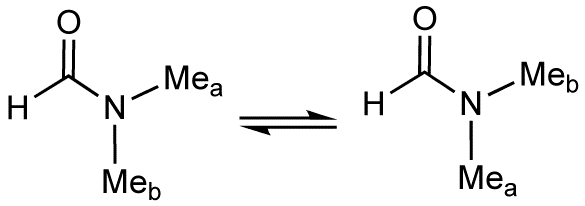

At temperatures near 100 °C, the 500 MHz ^{1}H NMR spectrum of DMF shows only one signal for the methyl groups. Near room temperature, however, separate signals are seen for the non-equivalent methyl groups. The rate of exchange can be calculated at the temperature where the two signals are just merged. This "coalescence temperature" depends on the measuring field. The relevant equation is

$$k = \frac{\pi \Delta \nu_0}{\sqrt{2}} \sim 2 \Delta \nu_0,$$

where Δν_{0} is the difference between the frequencies (in Hz) of the exchanging sites. These frequencies are obtained from the limiting low-temperature NMR spectrum. At these lower temperatures, the dynamics continue, of course, but the contribution of the dynamics to line broadening is negligible.

For example, if Δν_{0} = 1ppm @ 500 MHz,

$k \sim 2(500) = 1000~\text{s}^{-1}$ (~0.5 millisecond half-life).

=== "Ring whizzing" ===
The compound Fe(η^{5}-C_{5}H_{5})(η^{1}-C_{5}H_{5})(CO)_{2} exhibits the phenomenon of "ring whizzing".

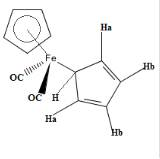
The structure of the ring whizzer Fe(η^{5}-C_{5}H_{5}) (η^{1}-C_{5}H_{5})(CO)_{2}

At 30 °C, the ^{1}H NMR spectrum shows only two peaks, one typical (δ5.6) of the η^{5}-C_{5}H_{5} and the other assigned η^{1}-C_{5}H_{5}. The singlet assigned to the η^{1}-C_{5}H_{5} ligand splits at low temperatures owing to the slow hopping of the Fe center from carbon to carbon in the η^{1}-C_{5}H_{5} ligand. Two mechanisms have been proposed, with the consensus favoring the 1,2 shift pathway.

== See also ==
- Pyramidal inversion – Fluxional process in trigonal-pyramidal molecules
- Bullvalene – Organic molecule (C10H10), a fluxional molecule
- Hapticity § Hapticity and fluxionality
- Molecular symmetry § Molecular rotation and molecular nonrigidity
- Pseudorotation – Movement of molecular ligands into a conformation indistinguishable from the original
  - Bailar twist – Chemical mechanism for isomerization
  - Bartell mechanism – Molecular phenomenon
  - Berry mechanism – Type of pseudorotation in chemistry
  - Ray–Dutt twist – Chemical mechanism for isomerization
