= Bailar twist =

Chemical mechanism for isomerization

Bailar twist mechanism

The Bailar twist is a mechanism proposed for the racemization of octahedral complexes containing three bidentate chelate rings. Such complexes typically adopt an octahedral molecular geometry, in which case they possess helical chirality. One pathway by which these compounds can racemize is via the formation of a trigonal prismatic intermediate with D3h point group symmetry. This pathway is named in honor of John C. Bailar, Jr., an inorganic chemist who investigated this process. An alternative pathway is called the Ray–Dutt twist.

== See also ==
- Pseudorotation
- Bartell mechanism
- Berry mechanism
- Ray–Dutt twist
- Fluxional molecule
