= Ray–Dutt twist =

Chemical mechanism for isomerization

The Ray–Dutt twist is a mechanism proposed for the racemization of octahedral complexes containing three bidentate chelate rings. Such complexes typically adopt an octahedral molecular geometry in their ground states, in which case they possess helical chirality. The pathway entails formation of an intermediate of C_{2v} point group symmetry. An alternative pathway that also does not break any metal-ligand bonds is called the Bailar twist. Both of these mechanism product complexes wherein the ligating atoms (X in the scheme) are arranged in an approximate trigonal prism.

This pathway is called the Ray–Dutt twist in honor of Priyadaranjan Ray and N. K. Dutt, inorganic chemists at the Indian Association for the Cultivation of Science abbr. IACS who proposed this process.

Ray-Dutt mechanism.

== See also ==
- Pseudorotation
- Bailar twist
- Bartell mechanism
- Berry mechanism
- Fluxional molecule
- Indian Association for the Cultivation of Science (IACS)
