= Octahedral molecular geometry =

Molecular geometry

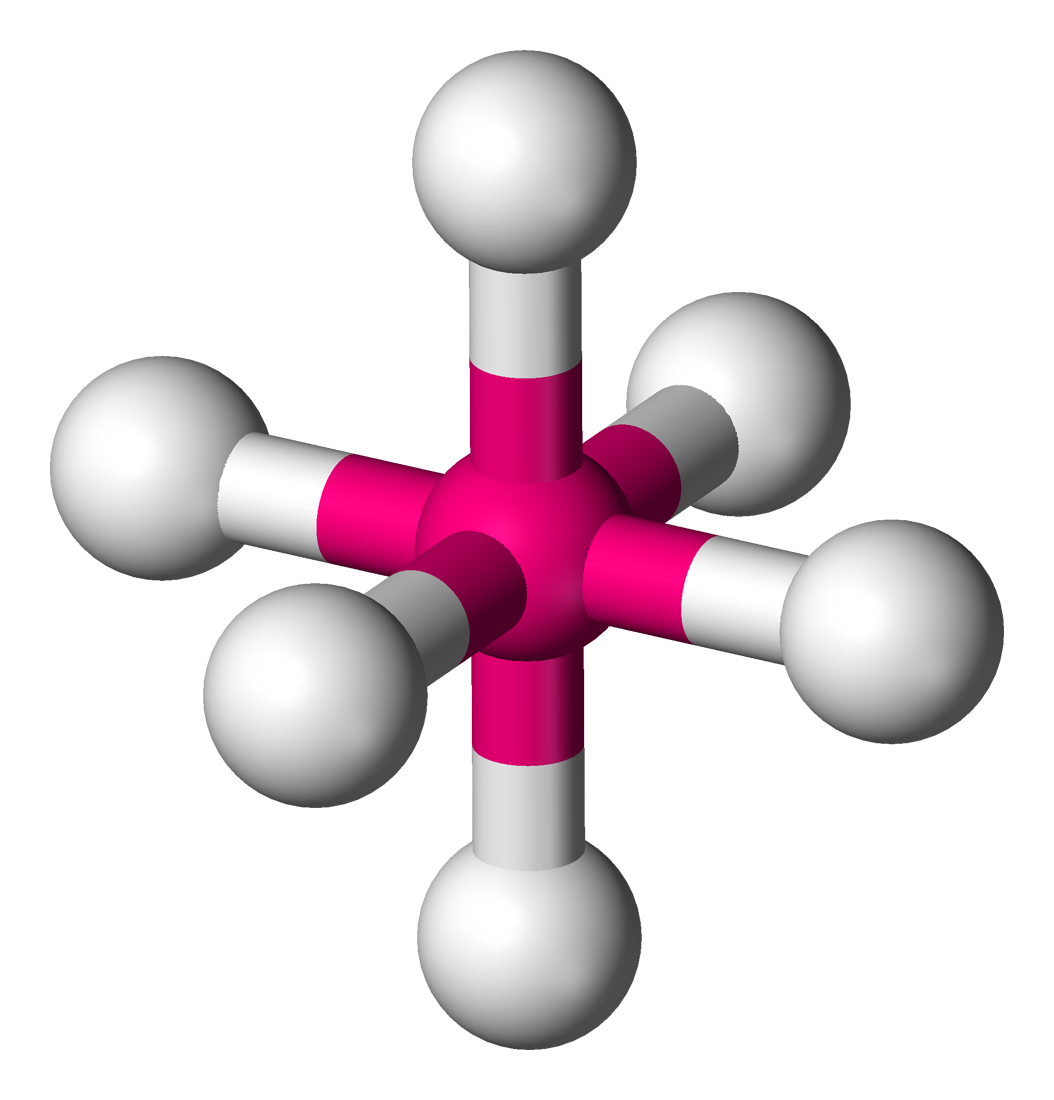
- Examples: SF_{6}, Mo(CO)_{6}
- Point group: O_{h}
- Coordination number: 6
- Bond angle(s): 90°
- μ (Polarity): 0

In chemistry, octahedral molecular geometry, also called square bipyramidal, describes the shape of compounds with six atoms or groups of atoms or ligands symmetrically arranged around a central atom, defining the vertices of an octahedron. The octahedron has eight faces, hence the prefix octa. The octahedron is one of the Platonic solids, although octahedral molecules typically have an atom in their centre and no bonds between the ligand atoms. A perfect octahedron belongs to the point group O_{h}. Examples of octahedral compounds are sulfur hexafluoride SF_{6} and molybdenum hexacarbonyl Mo(CO)_{6}. The term "octahedral" is used somewhat loosely by chemists, focusing on the geometry of the bonds to the central atom and not considering differences among the ligands themselves. For example, [Co(NH_{3})_{6}]^{3+}, which is not octahedral in the mathematical sense due to the orientation of the N−H bonds, is referred to as octahedral.

The concept of octahedral coordination geometry was developed by Alfred Werner to explain the stoichiometries and isomerism in coordination compounds. His insight allowed chemists to rationalize the number of isomers of coordination compounds. Octahedral transition-metal complexes containing amines and simple anions are often referred to as Werner-type complexes.

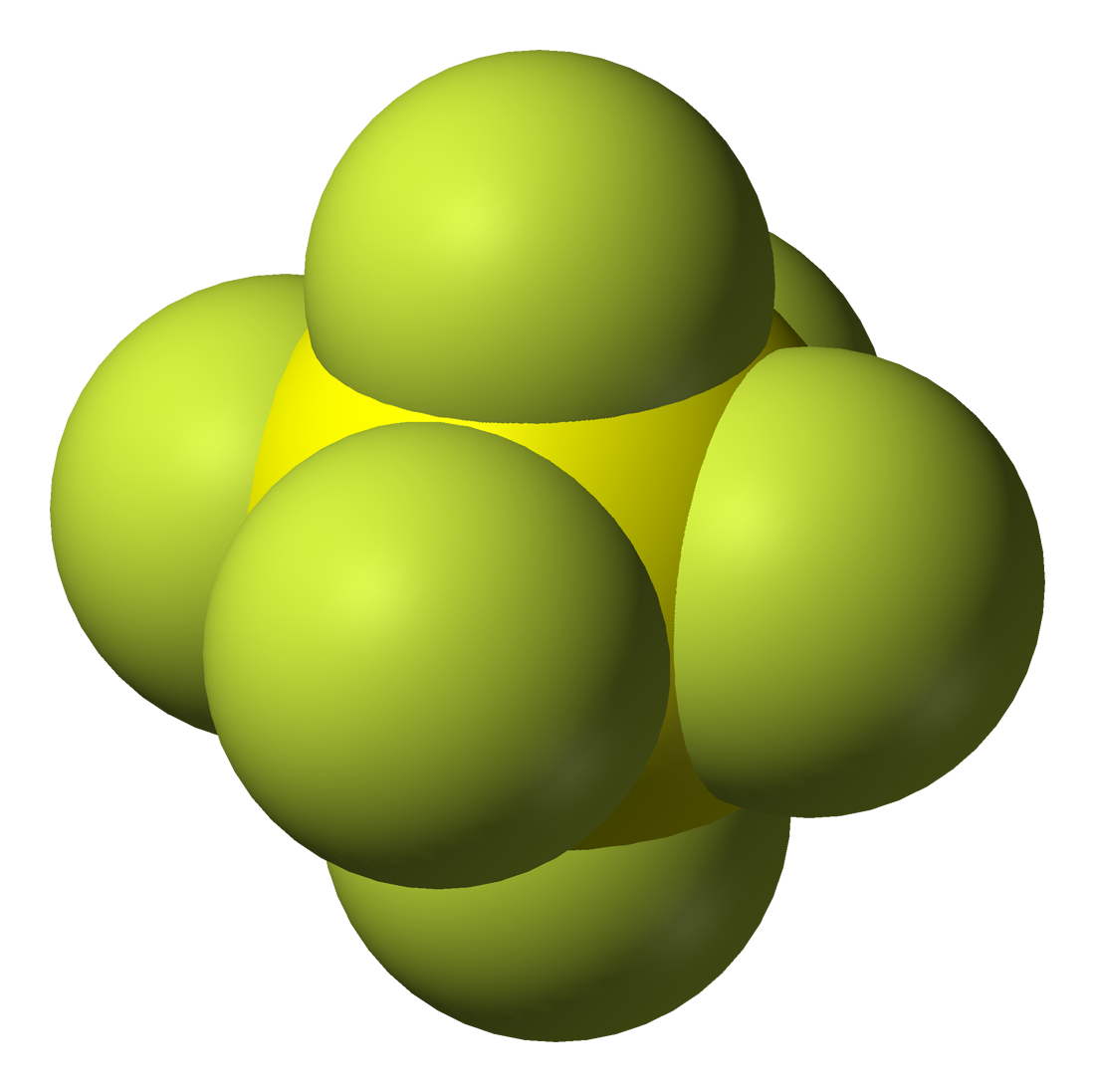
Structure of sulfur hexafluoride, an example of a molecule with the octahedral coordination geometry.

== Isomerism in octahedral complexes ==
When two or more types of ligands (L^{a}, L^{b}, ...) are coordinated to an octahedral metal centre (M), the complex can exist as isomers. The naming system for these isomers depends upon the number and arrangement of different ligands.

=== cis and trans ===
For ML^{a}_{4}L^{b}_{2}, two isomers exist. The cis isomer has the two L^{b} ligands adjacent to each other, whereas the trans isomer has them 180° to each other. It was the analysis of such complexes that led Alfred Werner to the 1913 Nobel Prize–winning postulation of octahedral complexes.

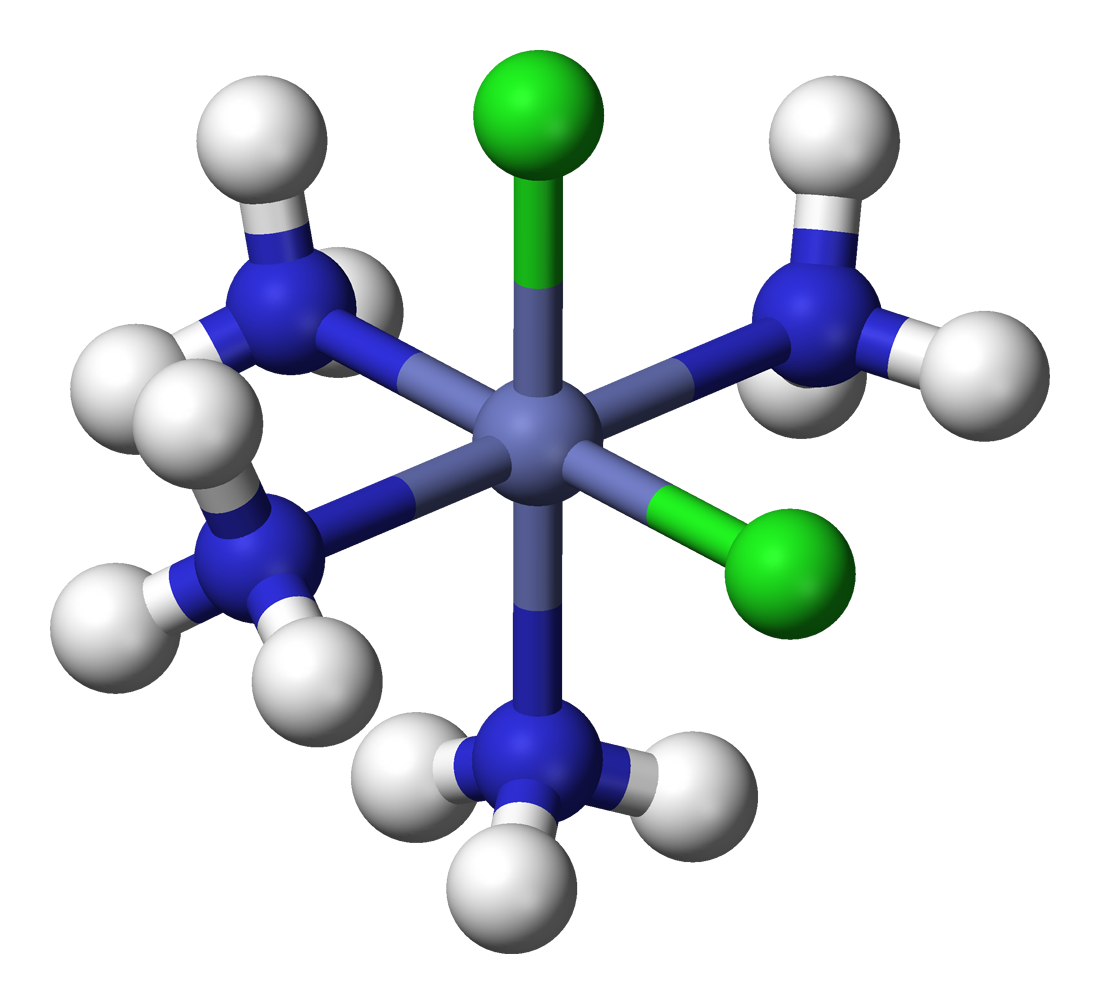
cis-[CoCl_{2}(NH_{3})_{4}]^{+}

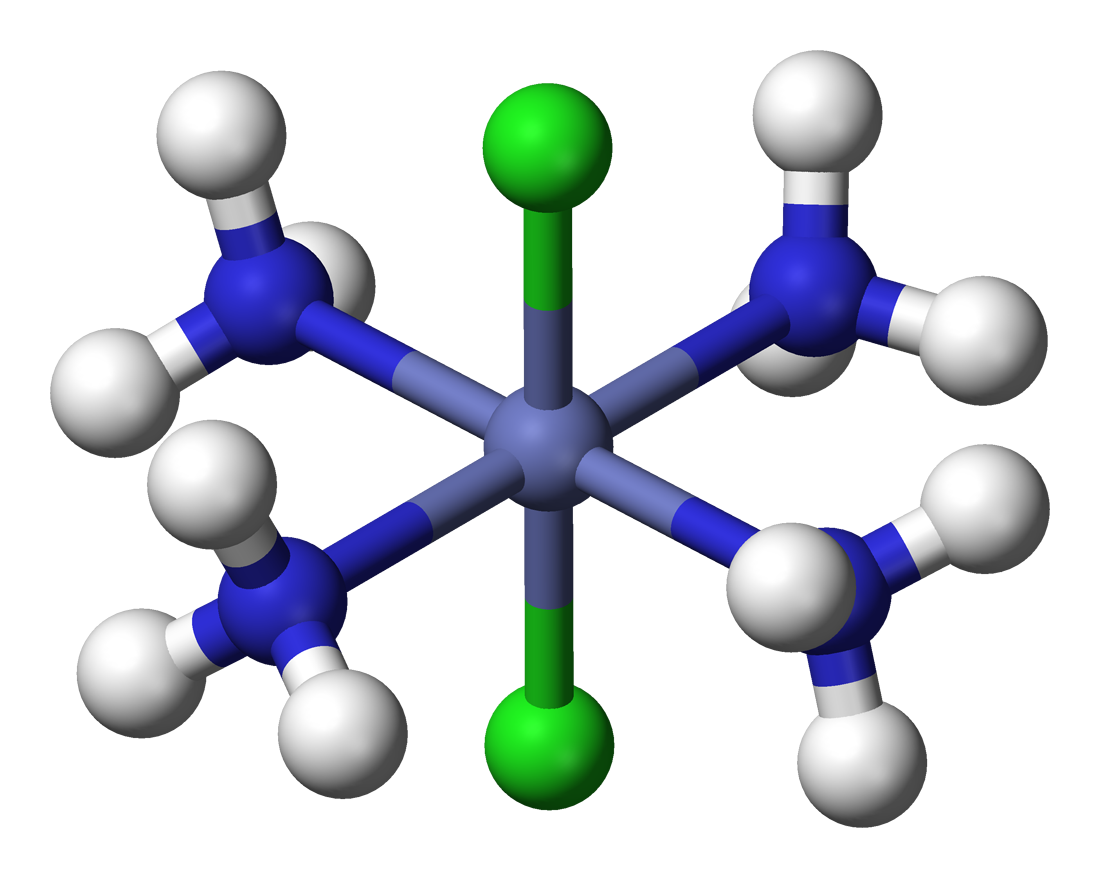
trans-[CoCl_{2}(NH_{3})_{4}]^{+}

=== Facial and meridional isomers ===
For ML^{a}_{3}L^{b}_{3}, two isomers are possible. The facial isomer (fac) has each set of three identical ligands occupying one face of the octahedron surrounding the central atom; all of the identical ligands are cis to each other. The meridional isomer (mer) has each set of three identical ligands occupying a plane passing through the central atom; two of the three are trans to each other and the third is cis to the first two.

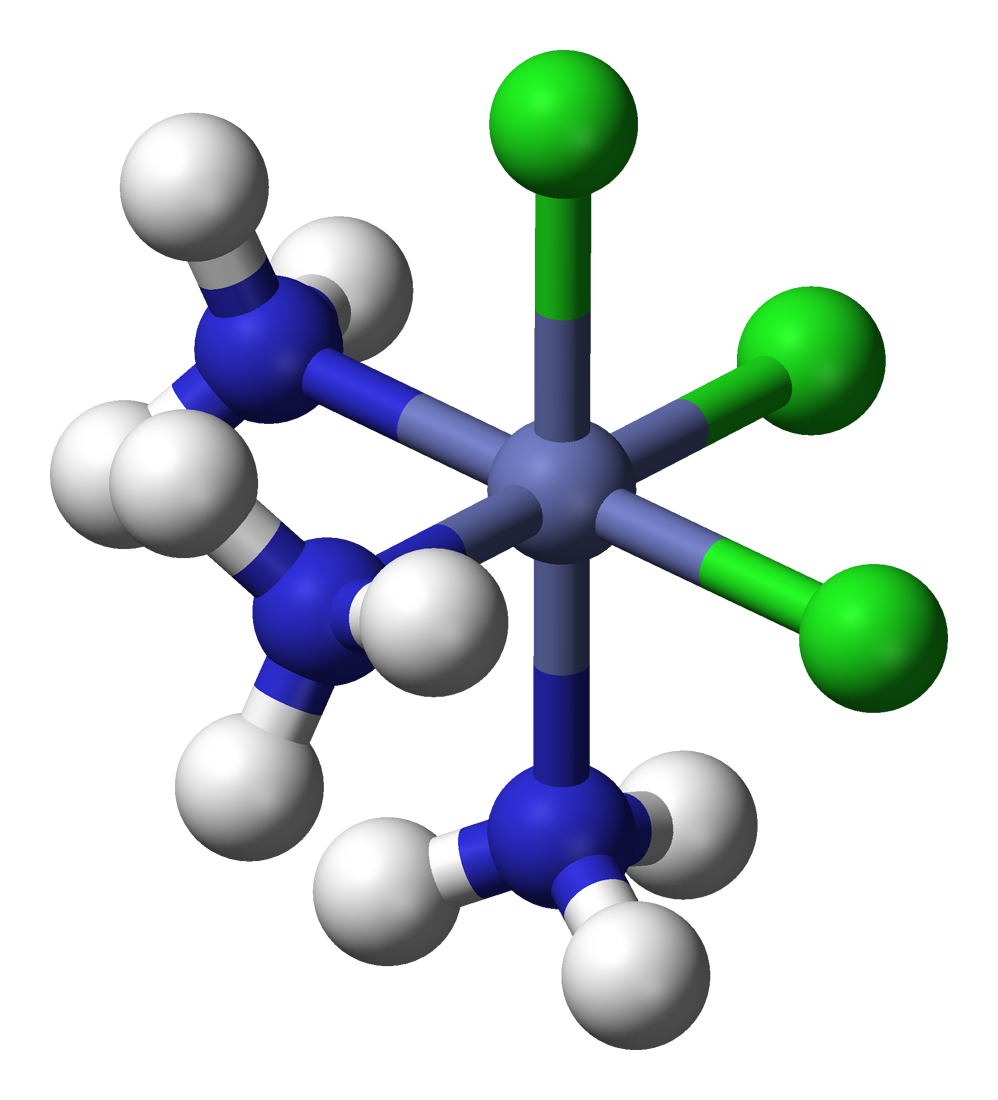
fac-[CoCl_{3}(NH_{3})_{3}]

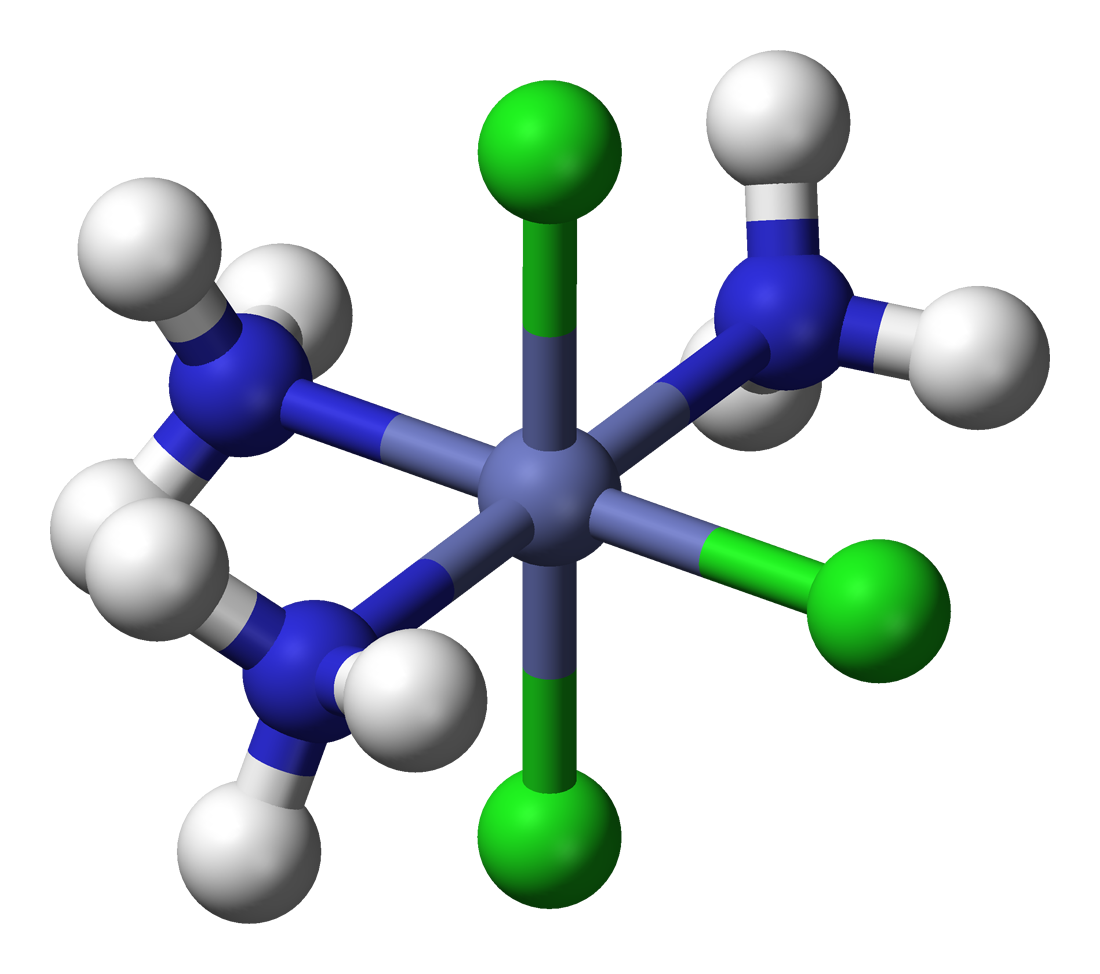
mer-[CoCl_{3}(NH_{3})_{3}]

=== Δ vs Λ isomers ===
Complexes with three bidentate ligands or two cis bidentate ligands can exist as enantiomeric pairs. Examples are shown below.

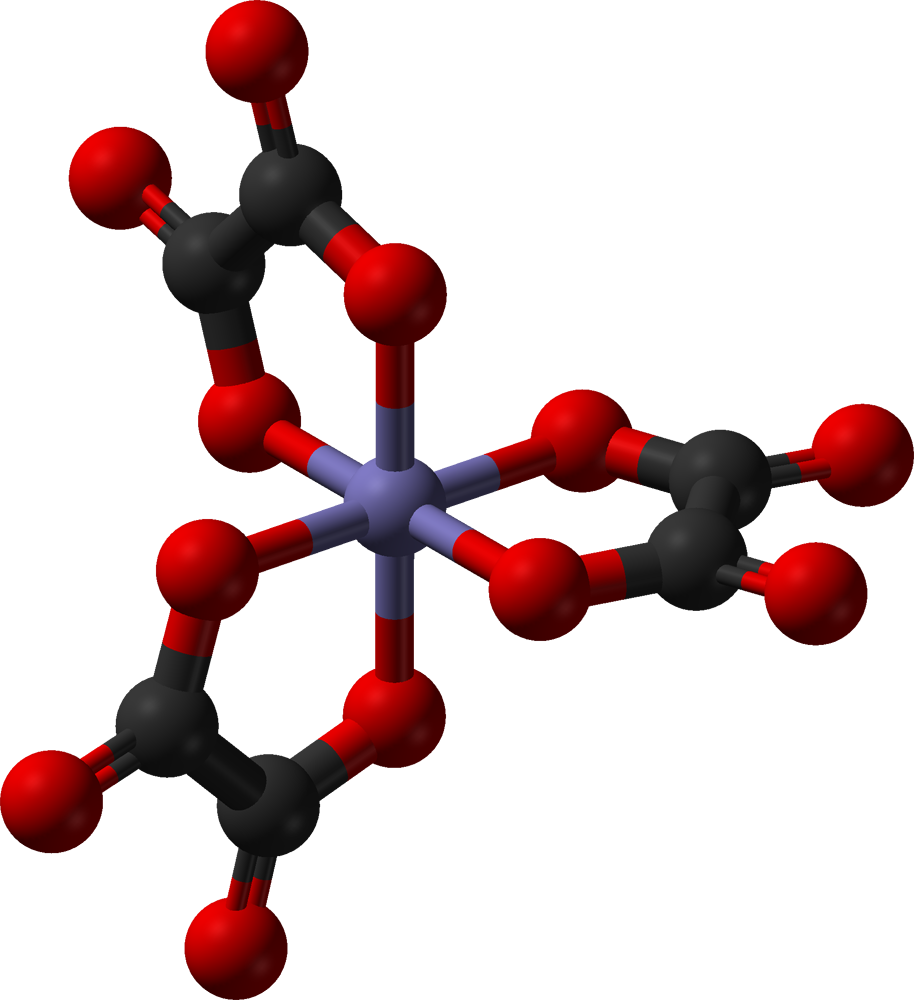
Λ-[Fe(ox)_{3}]^{3−}

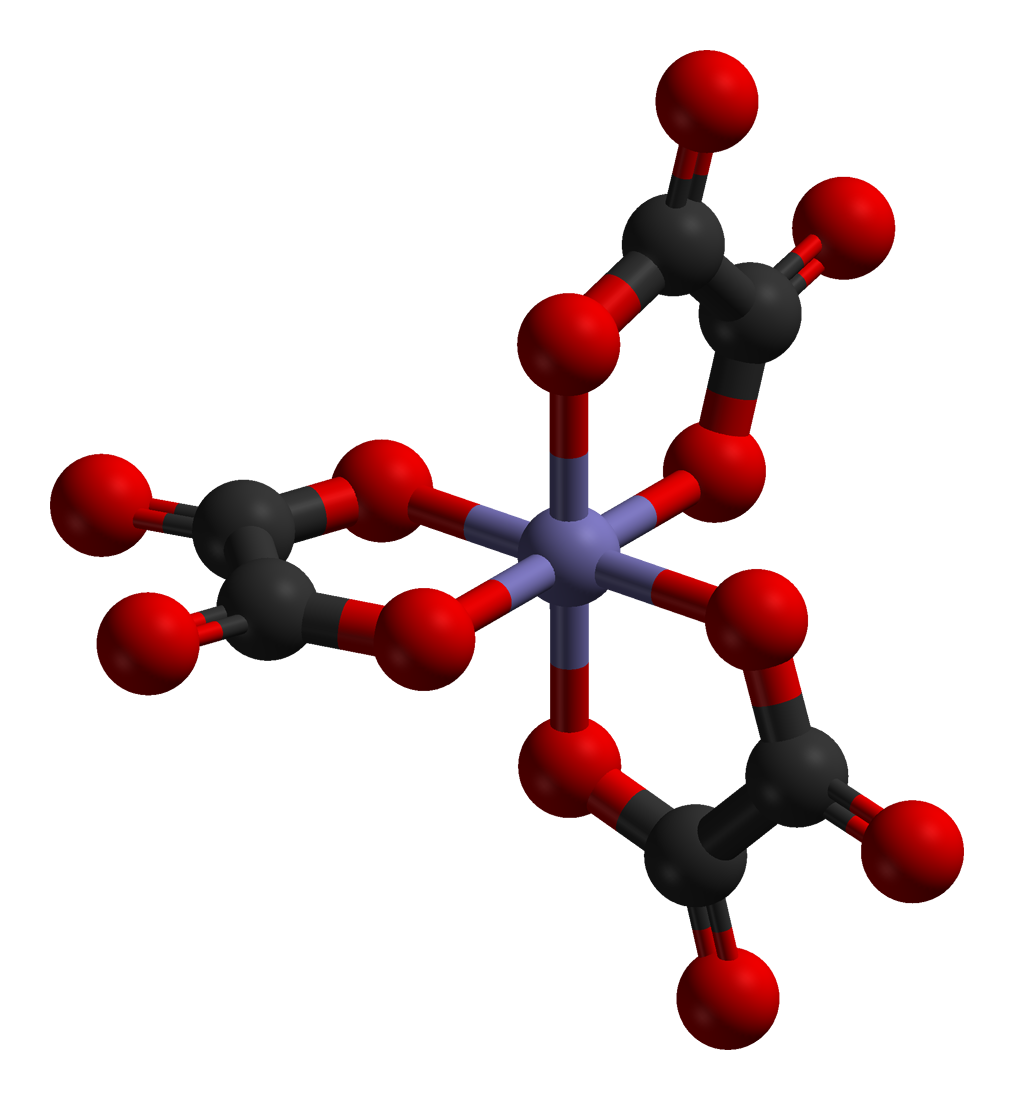
Δ-[Fe(ox)_{3}]^{3−}

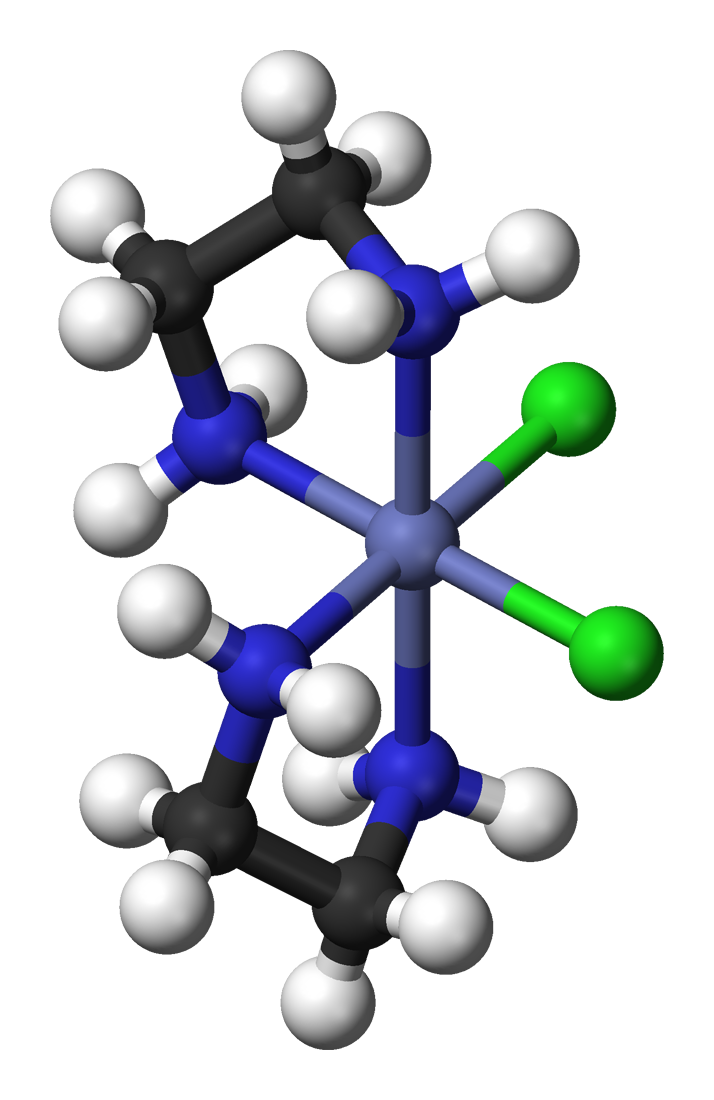
Λ-cis-[CoCl_{2}(en)_{2}]^{+}

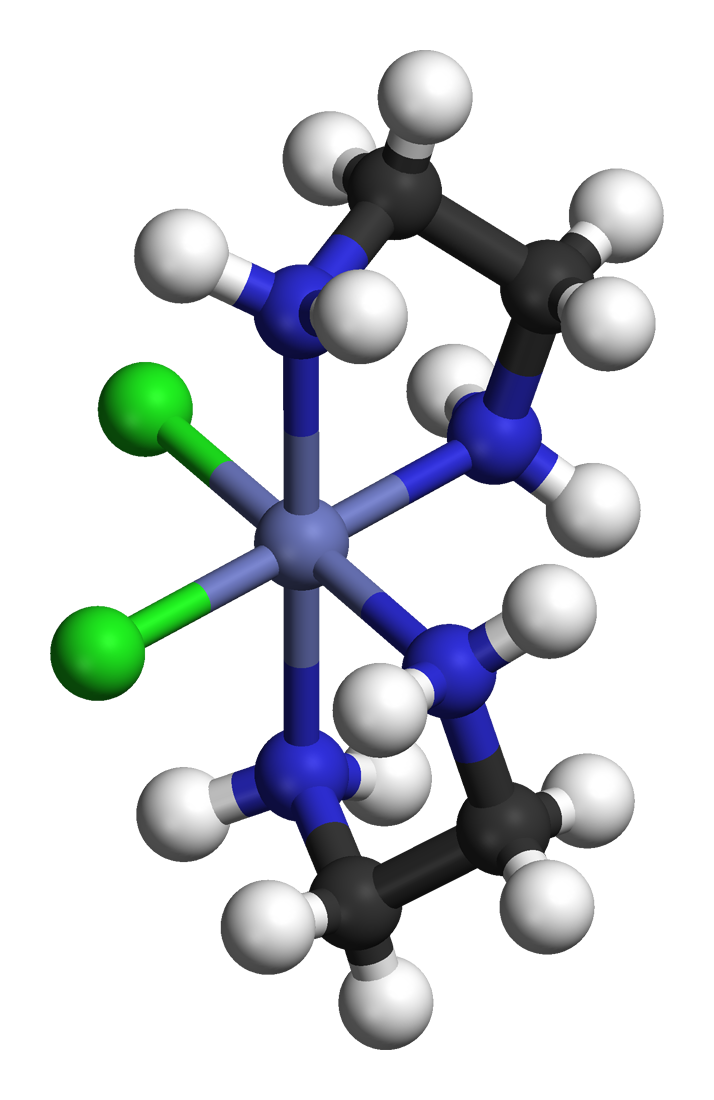
Δ-cis-[CoCl_{2}(en)_{2}]^{+}

=== Other ===
For ML^{a}_{2}L^{b}_{2}L^{c}_{2}, a total of five geometric isomers and six stereoisomers are possible.

1. One isomer in which all three pairs of identical ligands are trans
2. Three isomers in which one pair of identical ligands (L^{a} or L^{b} or L^{c}) is trans while the other two pairs of ligands are mutually cis.
3. Two enantiomeric pair in which all three pairs of identical ligands are cis. These are equivalent to the Δ vs Λ isomers mentioned above.

The number of possible isomers can reach 30 for an octahedral complex with six different ligands (in contrast, only two stereoisomers are possible for a tetrahedral complex with four different ligands). The following table lists all possible combinations for monodentate ligands:

Formula	Number of isomers	Number of enantiomeric pairs
ML_{6}	1	0
ML^{a}_{5}L^{b}	1	0
ML^{a}_{4}L^{b}_{2}	2	0
ML^{a}_{4}L^{b}L^{c}	2	0
ML^{a}_{3}L^{b}_{3}	2	0
ML^{a}_{3}L^{b}_{2}L^{c}	3	0
ML^{a}_{3}L^{b}L^{c}L^{d}	5	1
ML^{a}_{2}L^{b}_{2}L^{c}_{2}	6	1
ML^{a}_{2}L^{b}_{2}L^{c}L^{d}	8	2
ML^{a}_{2}L^{b}L^{c}L^{d}L^{e}	15	6
ML^{a}L^{b}L^{c}L^{d}L^{e}L^{f}	30	15

Thus, all 15 diastereomers of ML^{a}L^{b}L^{c}L^{d}L^{e}L^{f} are chiral, whereas for ML^{a}_{2}L^{b}L^{c}L^{d}L^{e}, six diastereomers are chiral and three are not (the ones where L^{a} are trans). One can see that octahedral coordination allows much greater complexity than the tetrahedron that dominates organic chemistry. The tetrahedron ML^{a}L^{b}L^{c}L^{d} exists as a single enantiomeric pair. To generate two diastereomers in an organic compound, at least two carbon centers are required.

== Deviations from ideal symmetry ==
=== Jahn–Teller effect ===
The term can also refer to octahedral influenced by the Jahn–Teller effect, which is a common phenomenon encountered in coordination chemistry. This reduces the symmetry of the molecule from O_{h} to D_{4h} and is known as a tetragonal distortion.

=== Distorted octahedral geometry ===
Some molecules, such as XeF_{6} or IF^{−}_{6}, have a lone pair that distorts the symmetry of the molecule from O_{h} to C_{3v}. The specific geometry is known as a monocapped octahedron, since it is derived from the octahedron by placing the lone pair over the centre of one triangular face of the octahedron as a "cap" (and shifting the positions of the other six atoms to accommodate it). These both represent a divergence from the geometry predicted by VSEPR, which for AX_{6}E_{1} predicts a pentagonal pyramidal shape.

== Bioctahedral structures ==
Pairs of octahedra can be fused in a way that preserves the octahedral coordination geometry by replacing terminal ligands with bridging ligands. Two motifs for fusing octahedra are common: edge-sharing and face-sharing. Edge- and face-shared bioctahedra have the formulas [M_{2}L_{8}(μ-L)]_{2} and M_{2}L_{6}(μ-L)_{3}, respectively. Polymeric versions of the same linking pattern give the stoichiometries [ML_{2}(μ-L)_{2}]_{∞} and [M(μ-L)_{3}]_{∞}, respectively.

The sharing of an edge or a face of an octahedron gives a structure called bioctahedral. Many metal pentahalide and pentaalkoxide compounds exist in solution and the solid with bioctahedral structures. One example is niobium pentachloride. Metal tetrahalides often exist as polymers with edge-sharing octahedra. Zirconium tetrachloride is an example. Compounds with face-sharing octahedral chains include MoBr_{3}, RuBr_{3}, and TlBr_{3}.

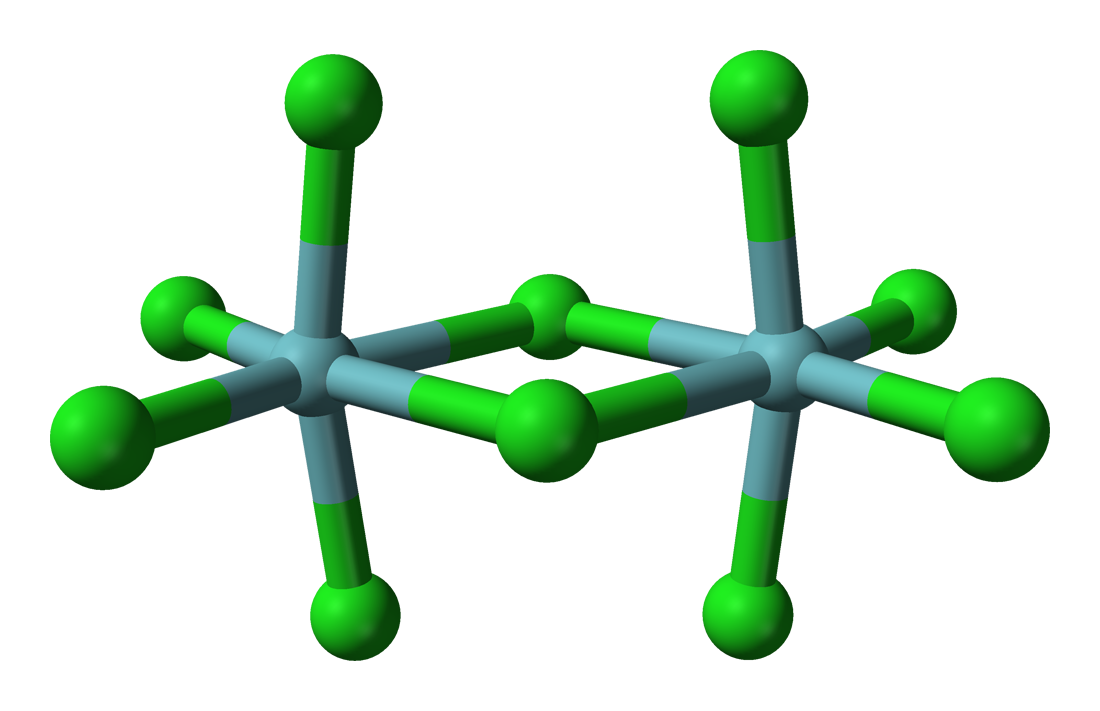
Ball-and-stick model of niobium pentachloride, a bioctahedral coordination compound.

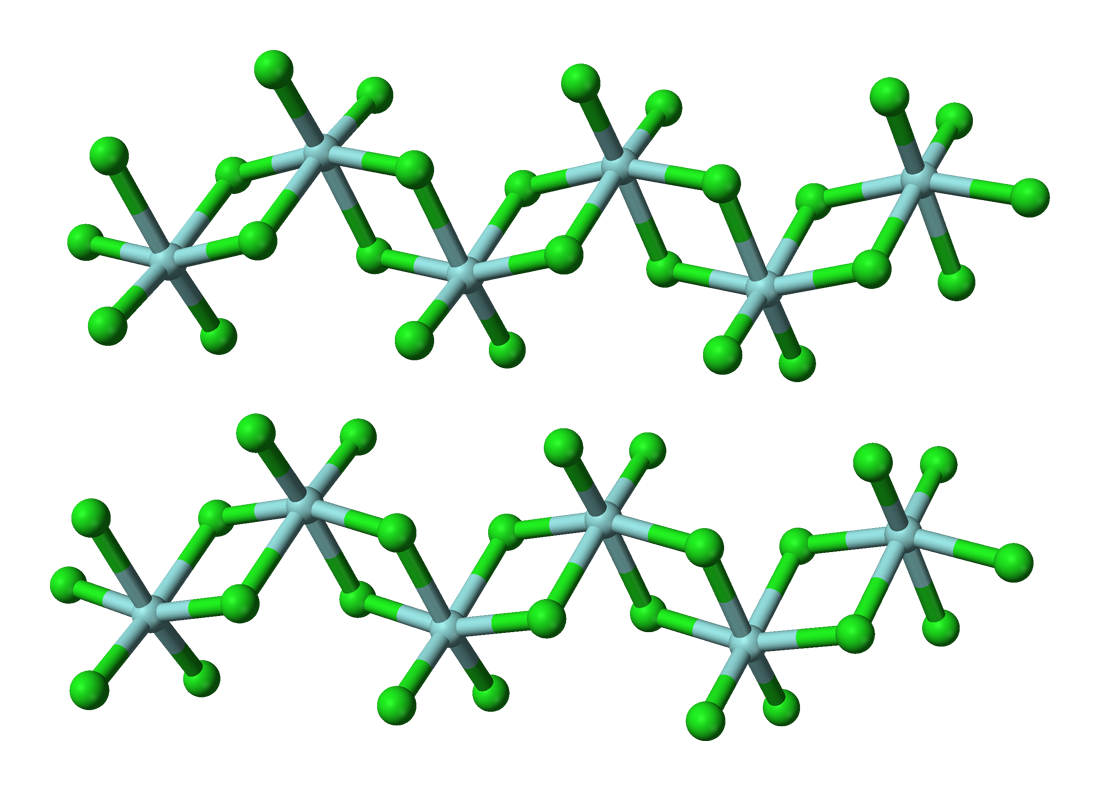
Ball-and-stick model of zirconium tetrachloride, an inorganic polymer based on edge-sharing octahedra.

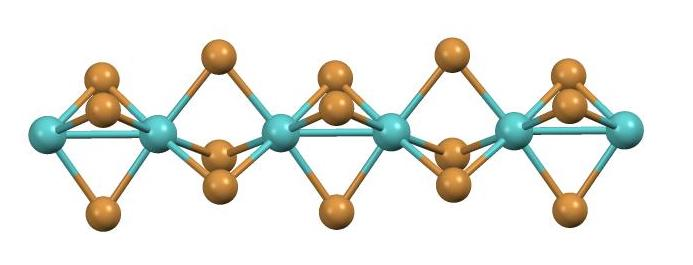
Ball-and-stick model of molybdenum(III) bromide, an inorganic polymer based on face-sharing octahedra.

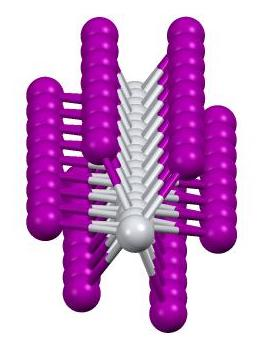
View almost down the chain of titanium(III) iodide highlighting the eclipsing of the halide ligands in such face-sharing octahedra.

== Trigonal prismatic geometry ==
For compounds with the formula MX_{6}, the chief alternative to octahedral geometry is a trigonal prismatic geometry, which has symmetry D_{3h}. In this geometry, the six ligands are also equivalent. There are also distorted trigonal prisms, with C_{3v} symmetry; a prominent example is W(CH_{3})_{6}. The interconversion of Δ- and Λ-complexes, which is usually slow, is proposed to proceed via a trigonal prismatic intermediate, a process called the "Bailar twist". An alternative pathway for the racemization of these same complexes is the Ray–Dutt twist.

== Splitting of d-orbital energies ==
For a free ion, e.g. gaseous Ni^{2+} or Mo^{0}, the energy of the d-orbitals are equal in energy; that is, they are "degenerate". In an octahedral complex, this degeneracy is lifted. The energy of the d_{z^{2}} and d_{x^{2}−y^{2}}, the so-called e_{g} set, which are aimed directly at the ligands are destabilized. On the other hand, the energy of the d_{xz}, d_{xy}, and d_{yz} orbitals, the so-called t_{2g} set, are stabilized. The labels t_{2g} and e_{g} refer to irreducible representations, which describe the symmetry properties of these orbitals. The energy gap separating these two sets is the basis of crystal field theory and the more comprehensive ligand field theory. The loss of degeneracy upon the formation of an octahedral complex from a free ion is called crystal field splitting or ligand field splitting. The energy gap is labeled Δ_{o}, which varies according to the number and nature of the ligands. If the symmetry of the complex is lower than octahedral, the e_{g} and t_{2g} levels can split further. For example, the t_{2g} and e_{g} sets split further in trans-ML^{a}_{4}L^{b}_{2}.

Ligand strength has the following order for these electron donors:

weak: iodine < bromine < fluorine < acetate < oxalate < water < pyridine < cyanide :strong

So called "weak field ligands" give rise to small Δ_{o} and absorb light at longer wavelengths.

== Reactions ==
Given that a virtually uncountable variety of octahedral complexes exist, it is not surprising that a wide variety of reactions have been described. These reactions can be classified as follows:

- Ligand substitution reactions (via a variety of mechanisms)
- Ligand addition reactions, including among many, protonation
- Redox reactions (where electrons are gained or lost)
- Rearrangements where the relative stereochemistry of the ligand changes within the coordination sphere.

Many reactions of octahedral transition metal complexes occur in water. When an anionic ligand replaces a coordinated water molecule the reaction is called an anation. The reverse reaction, water replacing an anionic ligand, is called aquation. For example, the [CoCl(NH_{3})_{5}]^{2+} slowly yields [Co(NH_{3})_{5}(H_{2}O)]^{3+} in water, especially in the presence of acid or base. Addition of concentrated HCl converts the aquo complex back to the chloride, via an anation process.

== See also ==
- Octahedral clusters
- AXE method
- Molecular geometry
