= Bartell mechanism =

Molecular phenomenon

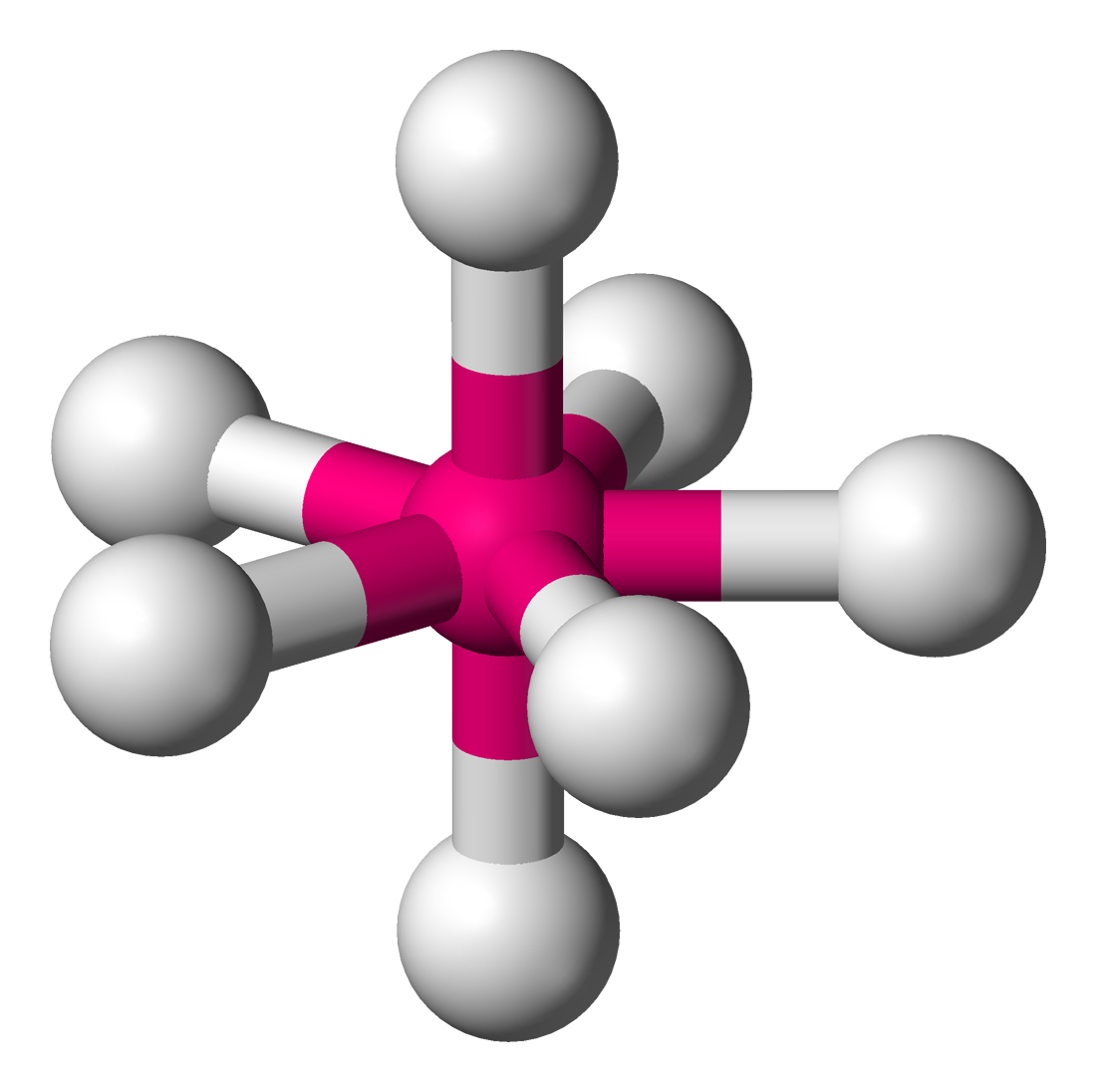
The pentagonal bipyramidal molecular geometry, on which the Bartell pseudorotation acts

The Bartell mechanism is a pseudorotational mechanism similar to the Berry mechanism. It occurs only in molecules with a pentagonal bipyramidal molecular geometry, such as IF_{7}. This mechanism was first predicted by H. B. Bartell in 1970. The mechanism exchanges the axial atoms with one pair of the equatorial atoms with an energy requirement of about 2.7 kcal/mol. Similarly to the Berry mechanism in square planar molecules, the symmetry of the intermediary phase of the vibrational mode is "chimeric" of other mechanisms; it displays characteristics of the Berry mechanism, a "lever" mechanism seen in pseudorotation of disphenoidal molecules, and a "turnstile" mechanism (which can be seen in trigonal bipyramidal molecules under certain conditions).

== See also ==
- Pseudorotation
- Bailar twist
- Berry mechanism
- Ray–Dutt twist
- Fluxional molecule
