= Berry mechanism =

Type of pseudorotation in chemistry

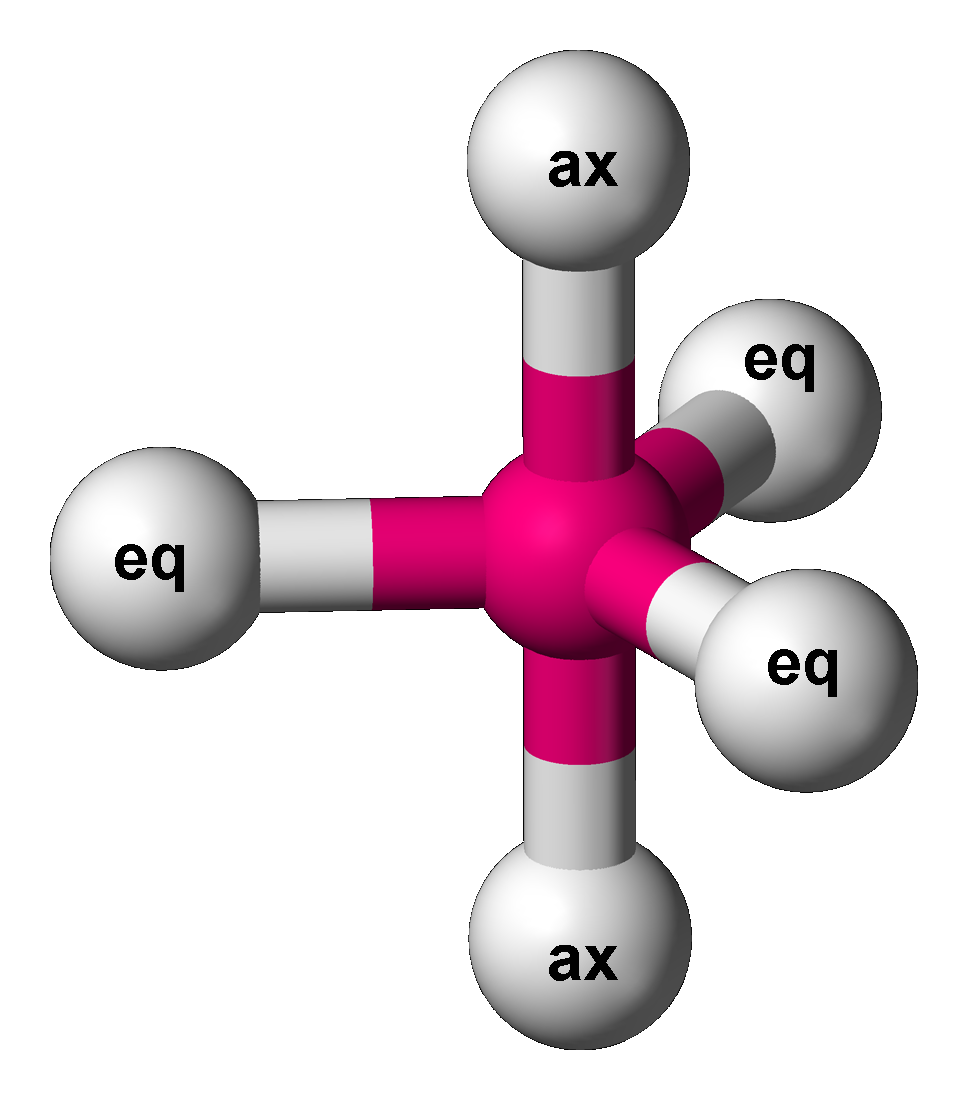
Trigonal bipyramidal molecular shape ax = axial ligands (on unique axis) eq = equatorial ligand (in plane perpendicular to unique axis)

The Berry mechanism, or Berry pseudorotation mechanism, is a type of vibration causing molecules of certain geometries to isomerize by exchanging the two axial ligands (see the figure) for two of the equatorial ones. It is the most widely accepted mechanism for pseudorotation and most commonly occurs in trigonal bipyramidal molecules such as PF_{5}, though it can also occur in molecules with a square pyramidal geometry. The Berry mechanism is named after R. Stephen Berry, who first described this mechanism in 1960.

== Berry mechanism in trigonal bipyramidal structure ==
The process of pseudorotation occurs when the two axial ligands close like a pair of scissors pushing their way in between two of the equatorial groups which scissor out to accommodate them. Both the axial and equatorial constituents move at the same rate of increasing the angle between the other axial or equatorial constituent. This forms a square based pyramid where the base is the four interchanging ligands and the tip is the pivot ligand, which has not moved. The two originally equatorial ligands then open out until they are 180 degrees apart, becoming axial groups perpendicular to where the axial groups were before the pseudorotation. This requires about 3.6 kcal/mol in PF_{5}.

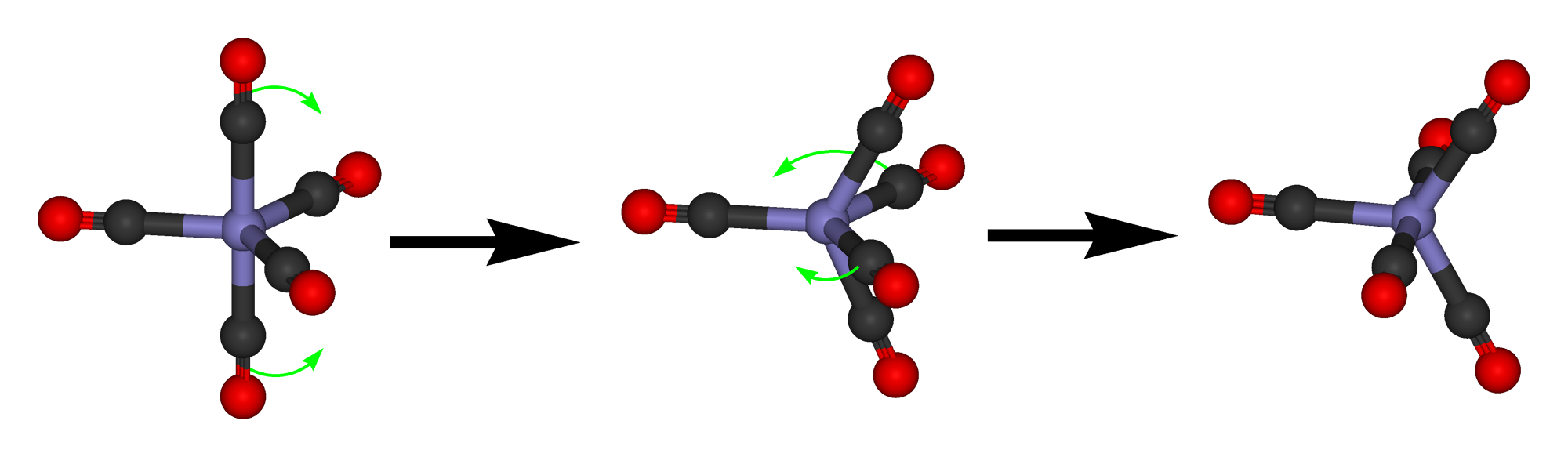
Iron-pentacarbonyl-Berry-mechanism

This rapid exchange of axial and equatorial ligands renders complexes with this geometry unresolvable (unlike carbon atoms with four distinct substituents), except at low temperatures or when one or more of the ligands is bi- or poly-dentate. Moreover, for complexes of monodentate ligands, there are 20 unique arrangements (including enantiomers), and it is possible through successive pseudorotations to reach every possible arrangement. The Levi graph of trigonal bipyramidal isomers via Berry pseudorotations has D_{3d} symmetry, akin to that of the molecule ethane in its most stable conformation.

== Berry mechanism in square pyramidal structure ==
The Berry mechanism in square pyramidal molecules (such as IF_{5}) is somewhat like the inverse of the mechanism in bipyramidal molecules. Starting at the "transition phase" of bipyramidal pseudorotation, one pair of fluorines scissors back and forth with a third fluorine, causing the molecule to vibrate. Unlike with pseudorotation in bipyramidal molecules, the atoms and ligands which are not actively vibrating in the "scissor" motion are still participating in the process of pseudorotation; they make general adjustment based on the movement of the actively vibrating atoms and ligands. However, this geometry requires a significant amount of energy to occur of about 26.7 kcal/mol.

== See also ==
- Pseudorotation
- Bailar twist
- Bartell mechanism
- Ray–Dutt twist
- Fluxional molecule
