= Racemization =

Conversion of an optically active chemical compound into an inactive form

In chemistry, racemization is a conversion, by heat or by chemical reaction, of an optically active compound into a racemic (optically inactive) form. This creates a 1:1 molar ratio of enantiomers and is referred to as a racemic mixture (i.e. contain equal amount of (+) and (−) forms). Plus and minus forms are called dextrorotation and levorotation. The D and L enantiomers are present in equal quantities, the resulting sample is described as a racemic mixture or a racemate. Racemization can proceed through a number of different mechanisms, and it has particular significance in pharmacology in as much as different enantiomers may have different pharmaceutical effects.

== Stereochemistry ==
Two enantiomers of a generic amino acid that is chiral

Chiral molecules have two forms (at each point of asymmetry), which differ in their optical characteristics: The levorotatory form (the (−)-form) will rotate counter-clockwise on the plane of polarization of a beam of light, whereas the dextrorotatory form (the (+)-form) will rotate clockwise on the plane of polarization of a beam of light. The two forms, which are non-superposable when rotated in 3-dimensional space, are said to be enantiomers. The notation is not to be confused with D and L naming of molecules which refers to the similarity in structure to D-glyceraldehyde and L-glyceraldehyde. Also, (R)- and (S)- refer to the chemical structure of the molecule based on Cahn–Ingold–Prelog priority rules of naming rather than rotation of light. R/S notation is the primary notation used for +/- now because D and L notation are used primarily for sugars and amino acids.

Racemization occurs when one pure form of an enantiomer is converted into equal proportion of both enantiomers, forming a racemate. When there are both equal numbers of dextrorotating and levorotating molecules, the net optical rotation of a racemate is zero. Enantiomers should also be distinguished from diastereomers which are a type of stereoisomer that have different molecular structures around a stereocenter and are not mirror images.

Partial to complete racemization of stereochemistry in solutions are a result of SN1 mechanisms. However, when complete inversion of stereochemistry configuration occurs in a substitution reaction, an SN2 reaction is responsible.

== Physical properties ==
In the solid state, racemic mixtures may have different physical properties from either of the pure enantiomers because of the differential intermolecular interactions (see Biological Significance section). The change from a pure enantiomer to a racemate can change its density, melting point, solubility, heat of fusion, refractive index, and its various spectra. Crystallization of a racemate can result in separate (+) and (−) forms, or a single racemic compound. However, in liquid and gaseous states, racemic mixtures will behave with physical properties that are identical, or near identical, to their pure enantiomers.

== Biological significance ==
In general, most biochemical reactions are stereoselective, so only one stereoisomer will produce the intended product while the other simply does not participate or can cause side-effects. Of note, the L form of amino acids and the D form of sugars (primarily glucose) are usually the biologically reactive form. This is due to the fact that many biological molecules are chiral and thus the reactions between specific enantiomers produce pure stereoisomers. Also notable is the fact that all amino acid residues exist in the L form. However, bacteria produce D-amino acid residues that polymerize into short polypeptides which can be found in bacterial cell walls. These polypeptides are less digestible by peptidases and are synthesized by bacterial enzymes instead of mRNA translation which would normally produce L-amino acids.

The stereoselective nature of most biochemical reactions meant that different enantiomers of a chemical may have different properties and effects on a person. Many psychotropic drugs show differing activity or efficacy between isomers, e.g. amphetamine is often dispensed as racemic salts while the more active dextroamphetamine is reserved for refractory cases or more severe indications; another example is methadone, of which one isomer has activity as an opioid agonist and the other as an NMDA antagonist.

Racemization of pharmaceutical drugs can occur in vivo. Thalidomide as the (R) enantiomer is effective against morning sickness, while the (S) enantiomer is teratogenic, causing birth defects when taken in the first trimester of pregnancy. If only one enantiomer is administered to a human subject, both forms may be found later in the blood serum. The drug is therefore not considered safe for use by women of child-bearing age and, while it has other uses, its use is tightly controlled. Thalidomide can be used to treat multiple myeloma.

Another commonly used drug is ibuprofen which is only anti-inflammatory as one enantiomer while the other is biologically inert. Likewise, the (S) stereoisomer is much more reactive than the (R) enantiomer in citalopram (Celexa), an antidepressant which inhibits serotonin reuptake, is active. The configurational stability of a drug is therefore an area of interest in pharmaceutical research. The production and analysis of enantiomers in the pharmaceutical industry is studied in the field of chiral organic synthesis.

== Formation of racemic mixtures ==
Racemization can be achieved by simply mixing equal quantities of two pure enantiomers. Racemization can also occur in a chemical interconversion. For example, when (R)-3-phenyl-2-butanone is dissolved in aqueous ethanol that contains NaOH or HCl, a racemate is formed. The racemization occurs by way of an intermediate enol form in which the former stereocenter becomes planar and hence achiral. An incoming group can approach from either side of the plane, so there is an equal probability that protonation back to the chiral ketone will produce either an R or an S form, resulting in a racemate.

Racemization can occur through some of the following processes:

- Substitution reactions that proceed through a free carbocation intermediate, such as unimolecular substitution reactions, lead to non-stereospecific addition of substituents which results in racemization.
- Although unimolecular elimination reactions also proceed through a carbocation, they do not result in a chiral center. They result instead in a set of geometric isomers in which trans/cis (E/Z) forms are produced, rather than racemates.
- In a unimolecular aliphatic electrophilic substitution reaction, if the carbanion is planar or if it cannot maintain a pyramidal structure, then racemization should occur, though not always.
- In a radical-substitution reaction, if the formation of the free radical takes place at a chiral carbon, then racemization is almost always observed.

The rate of racemization (from L-forms to a mixture of L-forms and D-forms) is used as a way of dating biological samples in tissues with slow rates of turnover, forensic samples, and fossils in geological deposits. This technique is known as amino acid dating.

== Discovery of optical activity ==
In 1843, Louis Pasteur discovered optical activity in paratartaric, or racemic, acid found in grape wine. He separated two enantiomer crystals that rotated polarized light in opposite directions.

== See also ==
- Dextrorotation and levorotation
- Enantiomer
- Racemic mixture
