= Tanabe–Sugano diagram =

Method of predicting a chemical complex's absorption spectrum

In coordination chemistry, Tanabe–Sugano diagrams are used to predict absorptions in the ultraviolet (UV), visible and infrared (IR) electromagnetic spectrum of coordination compounds. The results from a Tanabe–Sugano diagram analysis of a metal complex can also be compared to experimental spectroscopic data. They are qualitatively useful and can be used to approximate the value of 10Dq, the ligand field splitting energy. Tanabe–Sugano diagrams can be used for both high spin and low spin complexes, unlike Orgel diagrams, which apply only to high spin complexes. Tanabe–Sugano diagrams can also be used to predict the size of the ligand field necessary to cause high-spin to low-spin transitions.

In a Tanabe–Sugano diagram, the ground state is used as a constant reference, in contrast to Orgel diagrams. The energy of the ground state is taken to be zero for all field strengths, and the energies of all other terms and their components are plotted with respect to the ground term.

== Background ==
Until Yukito Tanabe and Satoru Sugano published their paper "On the absorption spectra of complex ions", in 1954, little was known about the excited electronic states of complex metal ions. They used Hans Bethe's crystal field theory and Giulio Racah's linear combinations of Slater integrals, now called Racah parameters, to explain the absorption spectra of octahedral complex ions in a more quantitative way than had been achieved previously. Many spectroscopic experiments later, they estimated the values for two of Racah's parameters, B and C, for each d-electron configuration based on the trends in the absorption spectra of isoelectronic first-row transition metals. The plots of the energies calculated for the electronic states of each electron configuration are now known as Tanabe–Sugano diagrams. Number must be fit for each octahedral coordination complex because the C/B can deviate strongly from the theoretical value of 4.0. This ratio changes the relative energies of the levels in the Tanabe–Sugano diagrams, and thus the diagrams may vary slightly between sources depending on what C/B ratio was selected when plotting.

== Parameters ==
The x-axis of a Tanabe–Sugano diagram is expressed in terms of the ligand field splitting parameter, Δ, or Dq (for "differential of quanta"), divided by the Racah parameter B. The y-axis is in terms of energy, E, also scaled by B. Three Racah parameters exist, A, B, and C, which describe various aspects of interelectronic repulsion. A is an average total interelectron repulsion. B and C correspond with individual d-electron repulsions. A is constant among d-electron configuration, and it is not necessary for calculating relative energies, hence its absence from Tanabe and Sugano's studies of complex ions. C is necessary only in certain cases. B is the most important of Racah's parameters in this case. One line corresponds to each electronic state. The bending of certain lines is due to the mixing of terms with the same symmetry. Although electronic transitions are only "allowed" if the spin multiplicity remains the same (i.e. electrons do not change from spin up to spin down or vice versa when moving from one energy level to another), energy levels for "spin-forbidden" electronic states are included in the diagrams, which are also not included in Orgel diagrams. Each state is given its molecular-symmetry label (e.g. A_{1g}, T_{2g}, etc.), but "g" and "u" subscripts are usually left off because it is understood that all the states are gerade. Labels for each state are usually written on the right side of the table, though for more complicated diagrams (e.g. d^{6}) labels may be written in other locations for clarity. Term symbols (e.g. ^{3}P, ^{1}S, etc.) for a specific d^{n} free ion are listed, in order of increasing energy, on the y-axis of the diagram. The relative order of energies is determined using Hund's rules. For an octahedral complex, the spherical, free ion term symbols split accordingly:

Splitting of Term Symbols from Spherical to Octahedral Symmetry
| Term | Degeneracy | States in an octahedral field |
|---|---|---|
| S | 1 | A_{1g} |
| P | 3 | T_{1u} |
| D | 5 | E_{g} + T_{2g} |
| F | 7 | A_{2g} + T_{1g} + T_{2g} |
| G | 9 | A_{1g} + E_{g} + T_{1g} + T_{2g} |
| H | 11 | E_{g} + T_{1g} + T_{1g} + T_{2g} |
| I | 13 | A_{1g} + A_{2g} + E_{g} + T_{1g} + T_{2g} + T_{2g} |

Certain Tanabe–Sugano diagrams (d^{4}, d^{5}, d^{6}, and d^{7}) also have a vertical line drawn at a specific Dq/B value, which is accompanied by a discontinuity in the slopes of the excited states' energy levels. This pucker in the lines occurs when the identity of the ground state changes, shown in the diagram below. The left depicts the relative energies of the d^{7} ion states as functions of crystal field strength (Dq), showing an intersection of the ^{4}T_{1} and the ^{2}E states near Dq/B ~ 2.1. Subtracting the ground state energy produces the standard Tanabe–Sugano diagram shown on the right.

This change in identity generally happens when the spin pairing energy, P, is equal to the ligand field splitting energy, Dq. Complexes to the left of this line (lower Dq/B values) are high-spin, while complexes to the right (higher Dq/B values) are low-spin. There is no low-spin or high-spin designation for d^{2}, d^{3}, or d^{8} because none of the states cross at reasonable crystal field energies.

== Tanabe–Sugano diagrams ==
The seven Tanabe–Sugano diagrams for octahedral complexes are shown below.

d^{2} electron configuration

d^{3} electron configuration

d^{4} electron configuration

d^{5} electron configuration

d^{6} electron configuration

d^{7} electron configuration

d^{8} electron configuration

== Unnecessary diagrams: d^{1}, d^{9} and d^{10} ==
=== d^{1} ===
There is no electron repulsion in a d^{1} complex, and the single electron resides in the t_{2g} orbital ground state. A d^{1} octahedral metal complex, such as [Ti(H_{2}O)_{6}]^{3+}, shows a single absorption band in a UV-vis experiment. The term symbol for d^{1} is ^{2}D, which splits into the ^{2}T_{2g} and ^{2}E_{g} states. The t_{2g} orbital set holds the single electron and has a ^{2}T_{2g} state energy of -4Dq. When that electron is promoted to an e_{g} orbital, it is excited to the ^{2}E_{g} state energy, +6Dq. This is in accordance with the single absorption band in a UV-vis experiment. The prominent shoulder in this absorption band is due to a Jahn–Teller distortion which removes the degeneracy of the two ^{2}E_{g} states. However, since these two transitions overlap in a UV-vis spectrum, this transition from ^{2}T_{2g} to ^{2}E_{g} does not require a Tanabe–Sugano diagram.

=== d^{9} ===
Similar to d^{1} metal complexes, d^{9} octahedral metal complexes have ^{2}D spectral term. The transition is from the (t_{2g})^{6}(e_{g})^{3} configuration (^{2}E_{g} state) to the (t_{2g})^{5}(e_{g})^{4} configuration (^{2}T_{2g} state). This could also be described as a positive "hole" that moves from the e_{g} to the t_{2g} orbital set. The sign of Dq is opposite that for d^{1}, with a ^{2}E_{g} ground state and a ^{2}T_{2g} excited state. Like the d^{1} case, d^{9} octahedral complexes do not require the Tanabe–Sugano diagram to predict their absorption spectra.

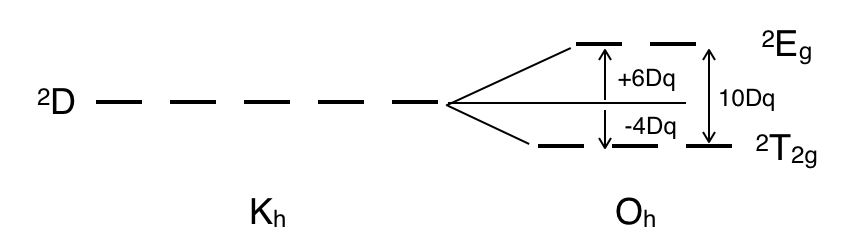
Splitting of ^{2}D term in an octahedral crystal field

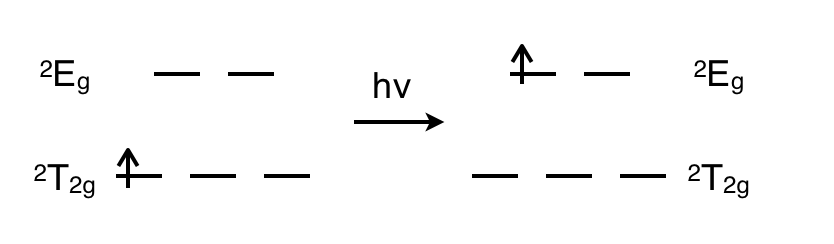
Electronic transition from ground state ^{2}T_{2g} to excited state ^{2}E_{g} for a d^{1} electron configuration

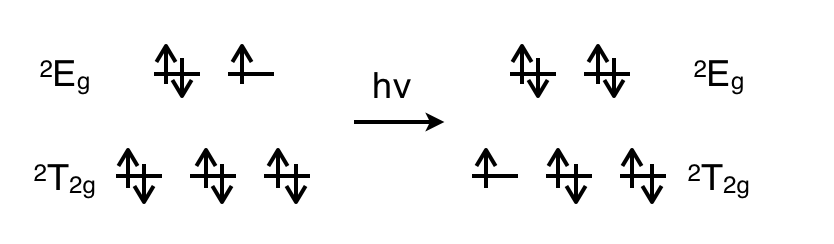
Electronic transition from ground state to excited state for a d^{9} electron configuration

=== d^{10} ===
There are no d-d electron transitions in d^{10} metal complexes because the d orbitals are completely filled. Thus, UV-vis absorption bands are not observed and a Tanabe–Sugano diagram does not exist.

== Diagrams for tetrahedral symmetry ==
Tetrahedral Tanabe–Sugano diagrams are generally not found in textbooks because the diagram for a d^{n} tetrahedral will be similar to that for d^{(10-n)} octahedral, remembering that Δ_{T} for tetrahedral complexes is approximately 4/9 of Δ_{O} for an octahedral complex. A consequence of the much smaller size of Δ_{T} results in (almost) all tetrahedral complexes being high spin and therefore the change in the ground state term seen on the X-axis for octahedral d^{4}-d^{7} diagrams is not required for interpreting spectra of tetrahedral complexes.

== Advantages over Orgel diagrams ==
In Orgel diagrams, the magnitude of the splitting energy exerted by the ligands on d orbitals, as a free ion approach a ligand field, is compared to the electron-repulsion energy, which are both sufficient at providing the placement of electrons. However, if the ligand field splitting energy, 10Dq, is greater than the electron-repulsion energy, then Orgel diagrams fail in determining electron placement. In this case, Orgel diagrams are restricted to only high spin complexes.

Tanabe–Sugano diagrams do not have this restriction, and can be applied to situations when 10Dq is significantly greater than electron repulsion. Thus, Tanabe–Sugano diagrams are utilized in determining electron placements for high spin and low spin metal complexes. However, they are limited in that they have only qualitative significance. Even so, Tanabe–Sugano diagrams are useful in interpreting UV-vis spectra and determining the value of 10Dq.

== Applications as a qualitative tool ==
In a centrosymmetric ligand field, such as in octahedral complexes of transition metals, the arrangement of electrons in the d-orbital is not only limited by electron repulsion energy, but it is also related to the splitting of the orbitals due to the ligand field. This leads to many more electron configuration states than is the case for the free ion. The relative energy of the repulsion energy and splitting energy defines the high-spin and low-spin states.

Considering both weak and strong ligand fields, a Tanabe–Sugano diagram shows the energy splitting of the spectral terms with the increase of the ligand field strength. It is possible for us to understand how the energy of the different configuration states is distributed at certain ligand strengths. The restriction of the spin selection rule makes it even easier to predict the possible transitions and their relative intensity. Although they are qualitative, Tanabe–Sugano diagrams are very useful tools for analyzing UV-vis spectra: they are used to assign bands and calculate Dq values for ligand field splitting.

=== Examples ===
==== Manganese(II) hexahydrate ====
In the [Mn(H_{2}O)_{6}]^{2+} metal complex, manganese has an oxidation state of +2, thus it is a d^{5} ion. H_{2}O is a weak field ligand (spectrum shown below), and according to the Tanabe–Sugano diagram for d^{5} ions, the ground state is ^{6}A_{1}. Note that there is no sextet spin multiplicity in any excited state, hence the transitions from this ground state are expected to be spin-forbidden and the band intensities should be low. From the spectra, only very low intensity bands are observed (low molar absorptivity (ε) values on y-axis).

==== Cobalt(II) hexahydrate ====
Another example is [Co(H_{2}O)_{6}]^{2+}. Note that the ligand is the same as the last example. Here the cobalt ion has the oxidation state of +2, and it is a d^{7} ion. From the high-spin (left) side of the d^{7} Tanabe–Sugano diagram, the ground state is ^{4}T_{1}(F), and the spin multiplicity is a quartet. The diagram shows that there are three quartet excited states: ^{4}T_{2}, ^{4}A_{2}, and ^{4}T_{1}(P). From the diagram one can predict that there are three spin-allowed transitions. However, the spectrum of [Co(H_{2}O)_{6}]^{2+} does not show three distinct peaks that correspond to the three predicted excited states. Instead, the spectrum has a broad peak (spectrum shown below). Based on the T–S diagram, the lowest energy transition is ^{4}T_{1} to ^{4}T_{2}, which is seen in the near IR and is not observed in the visible spectrum. The main peak is the energy transition ^{4}T_{1}(F) to ^{4}T_{1}(P), and the slightly higher energy transition (the shoulder) is predicted to be ^{4}T_{1} to ^{4}A_{2}. The small energy difference leads to the overlap of the two peaks, which explains the broad peak observed in the visible spectrum.

== See also ==
- Character tables
- Laporte rule
