= Orgel diagram =

Energy diagrams for transition metal complexes

Orgel diagrams are correlation diagrams which show the relative energies of electronic terms in transition metal complexes, much like Tanabe–Sugano diagrams. They are named after their creator, Leslie Orgel. Orgel diagrams are restricted to only show weak field (i.e. high spin) cases, and offer no information about strong field (low spin) cases. Because Orgel diagrams are qualitative, no energy calculations can be performed from these diagrams; also, Orgel diagrams only show the symmetry states of the highest spin multiplicity instead of all possible terms, unlike a Tanabe–Sugano diagram. Orgel diagrams will, however, show the number of spin allowed transitions, along with their respective symmetry designations. In an Orgel diagram, the parent term (P, D, or F) in the presence of no ligand field is located in the center of the diagram, with the terms due to that electronic configuration in a ligand field at each side. There are two Orgel diagrams, one for d^{1}, d^{4}, d^{6}, and d^{9} configurations and the other with d^{2}, d^{3}, d^{7}, and d^{8} configurations.

Orgel diagrams

Figure 1: D Orgel Diagram

Figure 2: F and P Orgel Diagram

In an Orgel diagram, lines with the same Russell–Saunders terms will diverge due to the non-crossing rule, but all other lines will be linear. Also, for the D Orgel diagram, the left side contains d^{1} and d^{6} tetrahedral and d^{4} and d^{9} octahedral complexes. The right side contains d^{4} and d^{9} tetrahedral and d^{1} and d^{6} octahedral complexes. For the F Orgel diagram, the left side contains d^{2} and d^{7} tetrahedral and d^{3} and d^{8} octahedral complexes. The right side contains d^{3} and d^{8} tetrahedral and d^{2} and high spin d^{7} octahedral complexes.
