= Katheryn Emanuel Lawson =

African American chemist

- Born: Katheryn Lee Emanuel; September 15, 1926; Shreveport, Louisiana, U.S.
- Died: September 25, 2008 (aged 82); Michigan, U.S.
- Education: Dillard College; Tuskegee Institute; University of New Mexico
- Occupation: Chemist
- Notable work: Behavior of carrier-free tracers; Infrared absorption of inorganic substances; Ion-exchange resins, a bibliography of unclassified references
- Spouse: Kenneth Lawson (m. 1954)
- Children: 2

Kathryn Lee Emanuel Lawson (September 15, 1926 – September 25, 2008) was one of the first few female African American chemists who worked in Sandia National Laboratories. She studied properties of irradiated materials in Crystal Physics research division. She earned her PhD from the University of New Mexico in radiochemistry in 1957.

== Early life and education ==
Katheryn Emanuel was born to John Venus Emanuel and Ida L. Gillispe in Shreveport, Louisiana on September 15, 1926. After Emanuel attended racially segregated schools and graduated as the salutatorian of a racially segregated high school in 1941, she went to Dillard College (now Dillard University), a historically black college, in New Orleans and graduated with BA Cum Laude in Natural Science in 1945. Two years later, Emanuel went to Tuskegee Institute (now Tuskegee University) to pursue master's degree in organic chemistry. Meanwhile, she served as an assistant professor of chemistry in multiple colleges, including Bishop College, Savannah State University, Talladega College and Grambling State University, all of which are historically black colleges.

Four years later, Emanuel got promoted to and worked as associate professor of chemistry at Central State College (a historically black college and now Central State University) in Wilberforce, Ohio until 1954. Emanuel was offered an assistantship and the opportunity to study for PhD in University of New Mexico. Lawson finished her PhD in radiochemistry with a dissertation of Behavior of Indium at Tracer Concentrations in 1957.

== Career ==
Katheryn Emanuel Lawson started work as a biochemist in Veterans Administration Hospital in Albuquerque, New Mexico in 1957. A year later, she was invited to work in Sandia National Laboratories in Crystal Physics Research Division. At that time, Sandia Labs needed PhD graduates to work on weapon development. Lawson worked in material research while her job was to analyze molecular structure of irradiated materials. She also studied optical properties of transition metals and their combination with other elements. She tested their electrical and magnetic properties, which helped prove Crystal Field Theory.

While at Sandia National Labs, Lawson successively published several papers and books throughout her career. Her works include Behavior of carrier-free tracers, Infrared absorption of inorganic substances and Ion-exchange resins, a bibliography of unclassified references, and thermal properties of protective materials. In 1965, she was featured with her husband Kenneth Lawson in Ebony Magazine.

Later in her career, she committed to National Urban League's Black Executive Exchange Program to advise young African American to pursue higher education and to advise white manager to accept and recommend them. She also served on Fair Housing Board in Albuquerque after 1963.

Lawson also worked at Bendix Corporation Research Labs in Southfield, MI, starting in the 1970s.

She was a member of American Chemical Society.

== Personal life ==
Katheryn Emanuel Lawson married Kenneth Lawson, who was a chemist-bacteriologist studying for PhD in University of New Mexico, in 1954. The couple had two sons, William, who was born when she was in graduate school, and Kenneth Jr. Lawson died in Farmington, Michigan on September 25, 2008.
