= Nephelauxetic effect =

Term in the chemistry of transition metals

The nephelauxetic effect is a term used in the inorganic chemistry of transition metals. It refers to a decrease in the Racah interelectronic repulsion parameter, given the symbol B, that occurs when a transition-metal free ion forms a complex with ligands. The name "nephelauxetic" comes from the Greek for cloud-expanding and was proposed by the Danish inorganic chemist C. K. Jorgensen. The presence of this effect highlights the disadvantages of crystal field theory, which treats metal-ligand interactions as purely electrostatic, since the nephelauxetic effect reveals the covalent character in the metal-ligand interaction.

== Racah parameter ==
The decrease in the Racah parameter B indicates that in a complex there is less repulsion between the two electrons in a given doubly occupied metal d-orbital than there is in the respective M^{n+} gaseous metal ion, which in turn implies that the size of the orbital is larger in the complex. This electron cloud expansion effect may occur for one (or both) of two reasons. One is that the effective positive charge on the metal has decreased. Because the positive charge of the metal is reduced by any negative charge on the ligands, the d-orbitals can expand slightly. The second is the act of overlapping with ligand orbitals and forming covalent bonds increases orbital size, because the resulting molecular orbital is formed from two atomic orbitals.

The reduction of B from its free ion value is normally reported in terms of the nephelauxetic parameter β:

$$\beta = \frac{B_\text{complex}}{B_\text{free ion}}$$

Experimentally, it is observed that size of the nephelauxetic parameter always follows a certain trend with respect to the nature of the ligands present.

== Ligands ==
The list shown below enlists some common ligands (showing increasing nephelauxetic effect):

F^{−} < H_{2}O < NH_{3} < en < [NCS - N]^{−} < Cl^{−} < [CN]^{−} < Br^{−} < N_{3}^{−} < I^{−}

Although parts of this series may seem quite similar to the spectrochemical series of ligands - for example, cyanide, ethylenediamine, and fluoride seem to occupy similar positions in the two - others such as chloride, iodide and bromide (amongst others), occupy very different positions. The ordering roughly reflects the ability of the ligands to form good covalent bonds with metals - those that have a small effect are at the start of the series, whereas those that have a large effect are at the end of the series.

== Central metal ion ==
The nephelauxetic effect does not only depend upon the ligand type, but also upon the central metal ion. These too can be arranged in order of increasing nephelauxetic effect as follows:

Mn(II) < Ni(II) ≈ Co(II) < Mo(II) < Re(IV) < Fe(III) < Ir(III) < Co(III) < Mn(IV)

== See also ==
- Spectrochemical series
- Complex (chemistry)
