= Chemical bonding model =

A chemical bonding model is a theoretical model used to explain atomic bonding structure, molecular geometry, properties, and reactivity of physical matter. This can refer to:

- VSEPR theory, a model of molecular geometry.
- Valence bond theory, which describes molecular electronic structure with localized bonds and lone pairs.
- Molecular orbital theory, which describes molecular electronic structure with delocalized molecular orbitals.
- Crystal field theory, an electrostatic model for transition metal complexes.
- Ligand field theory, the application of molecular orbital theory to transition metal complexes.
