= Racah parameter =

Parameter in spectroscopy

The Racah parameters are a set of parameters used in atomic and molecular spectroscopy to describe the amount of total electrostatic repulsion in an atom that has multiple electrons.

When an atom has more than one electron, there will be some electrostatic repulsion between the electrons. The amount of repulsion varies from atom to atom, depending upon the number of electrons, their spin, and the orbitals that they occupy. The total repulsion can be expressed in terms of three parameters A, B and C which are known as the Racah parameters after Giulio Racah, who first described them. They are generally obtained empirically from gas-phase spectroscopic studies of atoms.

They are often used in transition-metal chemistry to describe the repulsion energy associated with an electronic term. For example, the interelectronic repulsion of a ^{3}P term is A + 7B, and of a ^{3}F term is A - 8B, and the difference between them is therefore 15B.

== Definition ==
The Racah parameters are defined as

$$\begin{pmatrix}
A \\ B\\ C\\
\end{pmatrix} = \begin{pmatrix}
1 & 0 & -49\\
0 & 1 & -5 \\
0 & 0 & 35 \\
\end{pmatrix}\begin{pmatrix}
F_0 \\ F_2\\ F_4\\
\end{pmatrix}$$

where $F_k$ are Slater integrals

$$\begin{pmatrix}
F_0 \\ F_2\\ F_4\\
\end{pmatrix} = \begin{pmatrix}
F^0 \\ \frac{1}{49}F^2\\ \frac{1}{441}F^4\\
\end{pmatrix}$$

and $F^k$ are the Slater-Condon parameters

$F^k := \int_0^\infty r_1^2 dr_1 \int_0^\infty r_2^2 dr_2 R^2(r_1) R^2(r_2)\frac{r_<^k}{r_>^{k+1}}$

where $R(r)$ is the normalized radial part of an electron orbital, $r_> = \max\{r_1,r_2\}$ and $r_< = \min\{r_1,r_2\}$ .

== See also ==
- Tanabe–Sugano diagram
- Nephelauxetic effect
