= Laporte rule =

Spectroscopic selection rule

The Laporte rule is a rule that explains the intensities of absorption spectra for chemical species. It is a selection rule that rigorously applies to atoms, and to molecules that are centrosymmetric, i.e. with an inversion centre. It states that electronic transitions that conserve parity are forbidden. Thus transitions between two states that are each symmetric with respect to an inversion centre will not be observed. Transitions between states that are antisymmetric with respect to inversion are forbidden as well. In the language of symmetry, g (gerade = even (German)) → g and u (ungerade = odd) → u transitions are forbidden. Allowed transitions must involve a change in parity, either g → u or u → g.

For atoms s and d orbitals are gerade, and p and f orbitals are ungerade. The Laporte rule implies that s to s, p to p, d to d, etc. transitions should not be observed in atoms or centrosymmetric molecules. Practically speaking, only d-d transitions occur in the visible region of the spectrum. The Laporte rule is most commonly discussed in the context of the electronic spectroscopy of transition metal complexes. However, low-intensity f-f transitions in the actinide elements can be observed in the near-infrared region.

The rule is named after Otto Laporte who published it in 1925 with William Frederick Meggers.

== Optical properties of transition metal complexes ==
Octahedral complexes have a center of symmetry and thus should show no d-d bands. In fact, such bands are observed, but are weak, having intensities orders of magnitude weaker than "allowed" bands. The extinction coefficients for d-d bands are in the range 5–200 L mol^{−1} cm^{−1} .

The allowedness of d-d bands arises because the centre of symmetry for these chromophores is disrupted for various reasons. Complexes are not perfectly symmetric all the time. Transitions that occur as a result of an asymmetrical vibration of a molecule are called vibronic transitions, such as those caused by vibronic coupling. Through such asymmetric vibrations, transitions are weakly allowed.

The Laporte rule is powerful because it applies to complexes that deviate from idealized O_{h} symmetry. For example, the d-d transitions for [Cr(NH_{3})_{5}Cl]^{2+} are weak (ε < 100) even though the complex is only of C_{4v} symmetry. This is because the Jahn-Teller distortion removes O_{h} symmetry, but does not affect centrosymmetry; the complex still has a centre of inversion.

The Laporte rule helps explain the intense colors often observed for the tetrahedral complexes. The tetrahedral point group lacks the inversion operation, so the Laporte rule does not apply. Illustrative of this effect are the disparate extinction coefficients for octahedral vs tetrahedral complexes of Co(II). For [Co(H_{2}O)_{6}]^{2+}, which is pink, ε ≈ 10. For [CoCl_{4}]^{2-}, which is deep blue, ε ≈ 600.

== Note on spin-selection rule ==
Complementing the Laporte rule, is the spin-selection rule, which forbids transitions that involve changes in spin state. Violations of both the Laporte and spin-selection rules results in particularly low extinction coefficients. Illustrative of this combined effect is the faintness of even concentrated solutions of octahedral Mn(II) and Fe(III) complexes.

== Derivation ==
The transition rate between ground and excited electronic states $\psi_g$ and $\psi_e$ can be computed to first order using Fermi's golden rule

$\Gamma_{g\to e} = \frac{2\pi}{\hbar} |\langle \psi_e | H' | \psi_g \rangle |^2 \delta(E_e - E_g)$

where $H'$ is the perturbing Hamiltonian applied to the system. In this case, we take a perturbation in the form of an applied electric field coupled to the dipole moment of the molecule. Since the wavelength of visible light is much greater than the spatial extent of a molecule, the dipole approximation is employed to give an interaction Hamiltonian of

$H' = - \boldsymbol{\mu} \cdot \mathbf{E}$

The matrix elements are therefore

$\langle \psi_e | H' | \psi_g \rangle = - e\mathbf{E} \cdot \int \psi_e^* \mathbf{r} \psi_g \; d^3 \mathbf{r}$

The position operator is odd under parity. If both $\psi_e$ and $\psi_g$ are of the same parity, then the integrand will be odd. Integrating over all space will then cause the matrix element to vanish, giving us the Laporte rule.

They key assumption in deriving the Laporte rule is the electric dipole approximation. In reality, this is only strictly true when the perturbing electromagnetic field's wavelength is infinitely longer than the size of the target species. Since atoms and molecules have nonzero spatial extent and the perturbing electromagnetic field cannot have an infinite wavelength, there can be higher order terms in the interaction Hamiltonian that allow for transitions between ground and excited states of the same parity. For that matter, Fermi's golden rule is itself an approximation to the full Dyson series expansion for the time evolution operator. It is therefore more accurate to state that transitions between ground and excited states of the same parity are electric dipole forbidden.

== See also ==
- Ligand field theory
- Tanabe–Sugano diagram
- Selection rule
