= Walsh diagram =

Diagrams in physical organic chemistry

Walsh Diagram of an HAH molecule.

Walsh diagrams, often called angular coordinate diagrams or correlation diagrams, are representations of calculated orbital binding energies of a molecule versus a distortion coordinate (bond angles), used for making quick predictions about the geometries of small molecules. By plotting the change in molecular orbital levels of a molecule as a function of geometrical change, Walsh diagrams explain why molecules are more stable in certain spatial configurations (e.g. why water adopts a bent conformation).

A major application of Walsh diagrams is to explain the regularity in structure observed for related molecules having identical numbers of valence electrons (e.g. why H_{2}O and H_{2}S look similar), and to account for how molecules alter their geometries as their number of electrons or spin state changes. Additionally, Walsh diagrams can be used to predict distortions of molecular geometry from knowledge of how the LUMO (Lowest Unoccupied Molecular Orbital) affects the HOMO (Highest Occupied Molecular Orbital) when the molecule experiences geometrical perturbation.

Walsh's rule for predicting shapes of molecules states that a molecule will adopt a structure that best provides the most stability for its HOMO. If a particular structural change does not perturb the HOMO, the closest occupied molecular orbital governs the preference for geometrical orientation.

== History ==
A paper by Robert S. Mulliken contains the first known diagram visualizing changes in molecular orbital energies as molecular geometry varied; Mulliken inferred his results on molecules of AB_{2} type from a variety of data sources. A.D. Walsh subsequently popularized the technique amongst the chemistry community, by demonstrating that perturbations to an idealized molecular structure could be deduced from the behavior of frontier orbitals in a Walsh diagram, the "rules of Walsh." Walsh substantiated his rules across a series of ten papers in one issue of the Journal of the Chemical Society, which also constituted a library of Walsh diagrams for small molecular geometries.

== Overview ==
Walsh originally constructed his diagrams by plotting what he described as "orbital binding energies" versus bond angles. What Walsh was actually describing by this term is unclear; some believe he was in fact referring to ionization potentials, however this remains a topic of debate. At any rate, the general concept he put forth was that the total energy of a molecule is equal to the sum of all of the "orbital binding energies" in that molecule. Hence, from knowledge of the stabilization or destabilization of each of the orbitals by an alteration of the molecular bond angle, the equilibrium bond angle for a particular state of the molecule can be predicted. Orbitals which interact to stabilize one configuration (ex. Linear) may or may not overlap in another configuration (ex. Bent), thus one geometry will be calculably more stable than the other.

Typically, core orbitals (1s for B, C, N, O, F, and Ne) are excluded from Walsh diagrams because they are so low in energy that they do not experience a significant change by variations in bond angle. Only valence orbitals are considered. However, one should keep in mind that some of the valence orbitals are often unoccupied.

== Generating Walsh diagrams ==
In preparing a Walsh diagram, the geometry of a molecule must first be optimized for example using the Hartree–Fock (HF) method for approximating the ground-state wave function and ground-state energy of a quantum many-body system. Next, single-point energies are performed for a series of geometries displaced from the above-determined equilibrium geometry. Single-point energies (SPEs) are calculations of potential energy surfaces of a molecule for a specific arrangement of the atoms in that molecule. In conducting these calculations, bond lengths remain constant (at equilibrium values) and only the bond angle should be altered from its equilibrium value. The single-point computation for each geometry can then be plotted versus bond angle to produce the representative Walsh diagram.

== Structure of a Walsh diagram ==
A Walsh diagram for an AH_{2} molecule (e.g. H_{2}O)

=== AH_{2} Molecules ===
For the simplest AH_{2} molecular system, Walsh produced the first angular correlation diagram by plotting the ab initio orbital energy curves for the canonical molecular orbitals while changing the bond angle from 90° to 180°. As the bond angle is distorted, the energy for each of the orbitals can be followed along the lines, allowing a quick approximation of molecular energy as a function of conformation. It is still unclear whether or not the Walsh ordinate considers nuclear repulsion, and this remains a topic of debate. A typical prediction result for water is a bond angle of 90°, which is not even close to the experimental derived value of 104°. At best the method is able to differentiate between a bent and linear molecule.

This same concept can be applied to other species including non-hydride AB_{2} and BAC molecules, HAB and HAAH molecules, tetraatomic hydride molecules (AH_{3}), tetraatomic nonhydride molecules (AB), H_{2}AB molecules, acetaldehyde, pentaatomic molecules (CH_{3}I), hexaatomic molecules (ethylene), and benzene.

== Reactivity ==
Walsh diagrams in conjunction with molecular orbital theory can also be used as a tool to predict reactivity. By generating a Walsh Diagram and then determining the HOMO/LUMO of that molecule, it can be determined how the molecule is likely to react. In the following example, the Lewis acidity of AH_{3} molecules such as BH_{3} and CH_{3}^{+} is predicted.

Six electron AH_{3} molecules should have a planar conformation. It can be seen that the HOMO, 1e’, of planar AH_{3} is destabilized upon bending of the A-H bonds to form a pyramid shape, due to disruption of bonding. The LUMO, which is concentrated on one atomic center, is a good electron acceptor and explains the Lewis acid character of BH_{3} and CH_{3}^{+}.

Walsh correlation diagrams can also be used to predict relative molecular orbital energy levels. The distortion of the hydrogen atoms from the planar CH_{3}^{+} to the tetrahedral CH_{3}-Nu causes a stabilization of the C-Nu bonding orbital, σ.

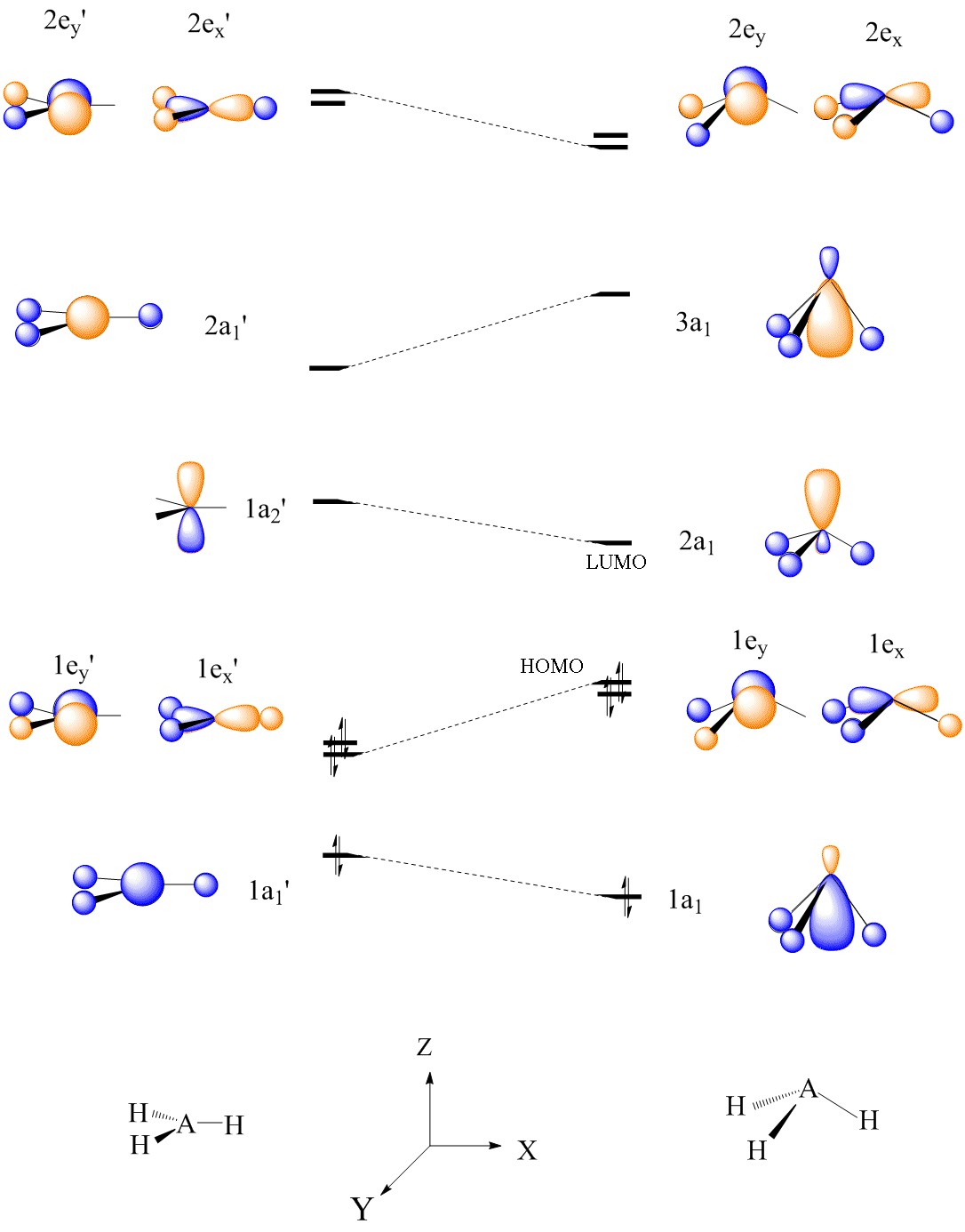
A Walsh diagram for a planar AH_{3} molecule

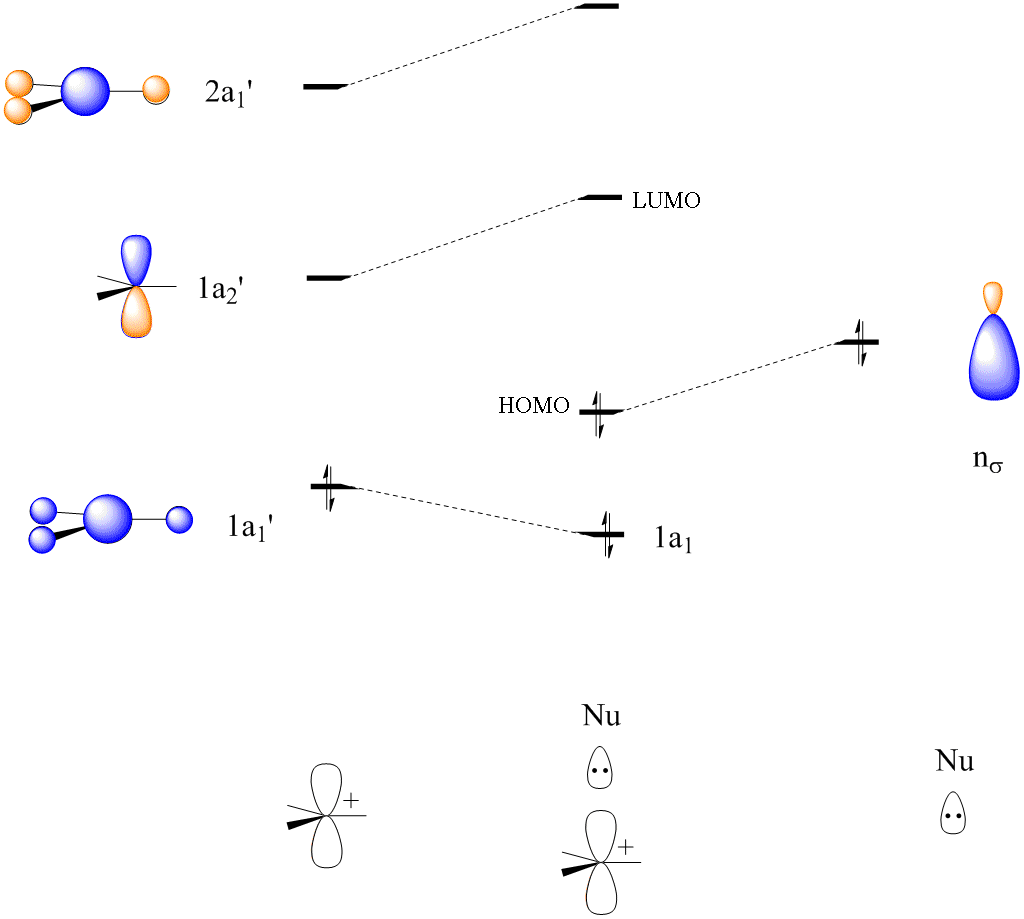
Orbital interaction diagram for nucleophilic addition to CH_{3}^{+}

== Other correlation diagrams ==
Other correlation diagrams are Tanabe-Sugano diagrams and Orgel diagrams.

== See also ==
- Ab initio quantum chemistry methods
- Molecular Orbital Theory
- Mulliken symbols
