= List of fellows of the Royal Society elected in 1964 =

Honour given to scientific researchers

This article lists fellows of the Royal Society elected in 1964.

== Fellows ==
1. Frank Adams
2. Clement Henry Bamford
3. Sir James Beament
4. Russell Brain, 1st Baron Brain
5. Margaret Burbidge
6. Sir Arnold Burgen
7. Leslie Hugh Norman Cooper
8. Sir Eric James Denton
9. Dan Eley
10. Sir Leslie Fowden
11. Peter Fowler
12. Cyril Garnham
13. Thomas Gold
14. John Laker (Jack) Harley
15. William Hayes
16. John Riley Holt
17. Sir William Hudson
18. David George Kendall
19. George Wallace Kenner
20. Henton Morrogh
21. Rodney Robert Porter
22. Alan Robertson
23. Percival Albert Sheppard
24. Sir Frederick Stewart
25. Arthur Donald Walsh

== Foreign members ==
1. James Franck
2. Andrey Kolmogorov
3. Konrad Lorenz
4. Tracy Sonneborn

== Statute 12 fellow ==
1. Rupert Guinness, 2nd Earl of Iveagh
