= A. D. Walsh =

British chemist and academic

Arthur Donald Walsh
- Born: 8 August 1916; Loughborough
- Died: 23 April 1977 (aged 60)
- Known for: Walsh diagram Walsh's rules
- Scientific career
- Workplaces: University of Dundee University of St Andrews University of Leeds

Arthur Donald Walsh FRS FRSE FRIC (8 August 1916 – 23 April 1977) was a British chemist, who served as Professor of Chemistry at the University of Dundee. He is usually referred to as Donald Walsh. He was the creator of the Walsh diagram and Walsh's Rules.

== Life ==
Arthur Donald Walsh was born on 8 August 1916 to Arthur Thomas Walsh (who worked for Messenger & Co. Ltd.) and Amy Florence (née Vollans). He spent his early years with the family at 11 Burton Street, Loughborough, first attending the local primary school, and then Loughborough Grammar School, from 1928 to 1935.

Walsh won a Mawson Scholarship to Corpus Christi College, Cambridge, graduating with a Natural Sciences Tripos in 1938. He then undertook research with W C Price on the spectra of double- and triple-bonded molecules, including butadiene, diacetylene and acrolein; he was awarded a PhD in 1941. He was then invited by Professor R G W Norrish to join a project on the study of knock in combustion engines; his work is described in detail in the FRS Biographical Memoir.

In the period 1946-1949 Walsh was funded by an ICI fellowship at Cambridge to continue work in both spectroscopy and combustion. This was followed by a lectureship (and then a readership) at Leeds, during which time he spent a semester as visiting professor at the University of California, Berkeley (1950–51). On his return he wrote his well-known series of ten papers on The electronic orbitals, shapes, and spectra of polyatomic molecules, published in 1953.

In 1955 he left Leeds to take the Baxter Chair of Chemistry at Queen's College, Dundee, then a part of the University of St Andrews where he then spent the rest of his career. During his tenure he expanded the number of staff in his department, and attracted several research chemists via industrial research grants. When Queen's College gained independence as the University of Dundee in 1967, he was appointed Dean of the Faculty of Science. As Dean of Science, he played a key role in creating a biochemistry department at the University. As convenor of the University of Dundee's gardens sub-committee he was a prime mover in developing open spaces on the institutions main campus, notably Frankland Court, the establishment of which particularly pleased him.

He was elected a Fellow of the Royal Society of Edinburgh. His proposers were Ernest Geoffrey Cullwick, George Dawson Preston, John Meadows Jackson, Alexander Murray MacBeath and Anthony Elliot Ritchie. He was elected a Fellow of the Royal Society (FRS) in 1964.

== Family ==
Walsh married Elin Frances Woolley in 1945. They had met in Cambridge when she was a student at Girton. Elin, a geographer, published a paper the year she was married.

The couple adopted two children (Peter in 1951 and Valerie in 1953) and later in 1957 had twins of their own in Dundee (Timothy and Margaret).

== Publications ==
- Knock in Internal Combustion Engines (1944)
- The Structures and Spectra of Molecules (1951)
