= Correlation diagram =

Terms such as correlation diagram(s), diagram(s) of correlation, and the like may refer to:

- Data visualization, the general process of presenting information visually
- Statistical graphics, images depicting statistical information
- Correlation diagram (chemistry), a specific kind of plot

== See also ==
- Correlation and dependence
- Covariance and correlation
- Diagram
- Infographics
- Molecular structures
