= Spin states (d electrons) =

Potential configurations of electrons

Spin states when describing transition metal coordination complexes refers to the potential spin configurations of the central metal's d electrons. For several oxidation states, metals can adopt high-spin and low-spin configurations. The ambiguity only applies to first row metals, because second- and third-row metals are invariably low-spin. These configurations can be understood through the two major models used to describe coordination complexes; crystal field theory and ligand field theory (a more advanced version based on molecular orbital theory).

== High-spin vs. low-spin ==
=== Octahedral complexes ===
Low-spin [Fe(NO_{2})_{6}]^{3−} crystal field diagram

The Δ of the d orbitals plays an important role in the electron spin state of a coordination complex. Three factors affect Δ: the period (row in periodic table) of the metal ion, the charge of the metal ion, and the field strength of the complex's ligands as described by the spectrochemical series. Only octahedral complexes of first row transition metals adopt high-spin states.

If Δ is large, then the lower energy orbitals are completely filled before population of the higher orbitals according to the Aufbau principle. Complexes such as this are called "low-spin" since filling an orbital matches electrons and reduces the total electron spin. If the separation between the orbitals is small enough then it is easier to put electrons into the higher energy orbitals than it is to put two into the same low-energy orbital, because of the repulsion resulting from matching two electrons in the same orbital. So, one electron is put into each of the five d orbitals before any pairing occurs in accord with Hund's rule resulting in what is known as a "high-spin" complex. Complexes such as this are called "high-spin" since populating the upper orbital avoids matches between electrons with opposite spin.

High-spin [FeBr_{6}]^{3−} crystal field diagram

The charge of the metal center affects Δ. The higher the oxidation state of the metal, the stronger the ligand field. Increased positive charge contracts the ionic radius and an increase in interaction of negatively charged ligands, both of which increase Δ. For a given ligand set, Fe^{2+} complexes more likely to be high spin than Co^{3+}, as illustrated by their complexes with EDTA.

Ligands also affect the magnitude of Δ of the d orbitals according to their field strength as described by the spectrochemical series. Strong-field ligands, such as CN^{−} and CO, increase the Δ and are more likely to be low-spin. Weak-field ligands, such as I^{−} and Br^{−} cause a smaller Δ splitting and are more likely to be high-spin.

Some octahedral complexes exhibit spin crossover, where the high and low spin states exist in dynamic equilibrium.

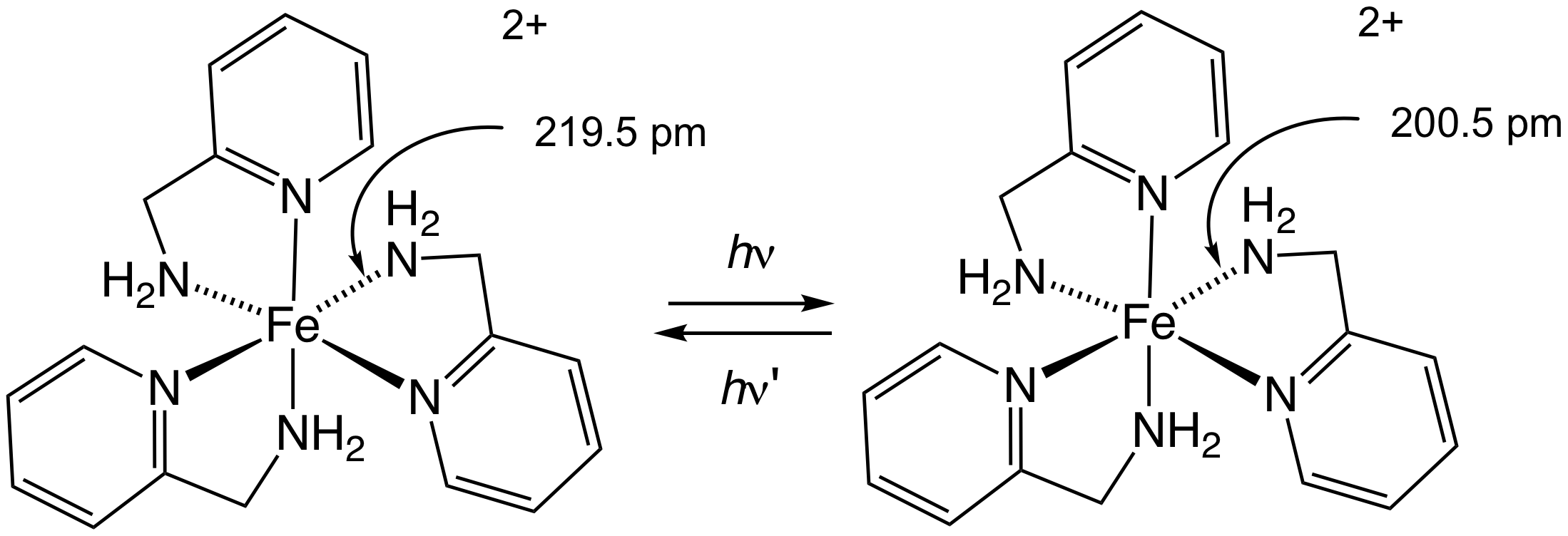
Light-induced spin-crossover of [Fe(pyCH_{2}NH_{2})_{3}]^{2+}, which switches from high and low-spin.

=== Tetrahedral complexes ===
Fe(4-norbornyl)_{4} is a rare example of a low-spin tetrahedral complex.

The Δ splitting energy for tetrahedral metal complexes (four ligands), Δ_{tet} is smaller than that for an octahedral complex. Consequently, tetrahedral complexes are almost always high spin Examples of low spin tetrahedral complexes include Fe(2-norbornyl)_{4}, [Co(4-norbornyl)_{4}]^{+}, and the nitrosyl complex Cr(NO)((N(tms)_{2})_{3}.

=== Square planar complexes ===
Many d^{8} complexes of the first row metals exist in tetrahedral or square planar geometry. In some cases these geometries exist in measurable equilibria. For example, dichlorobis(triphenylphosphine)nickel(II) has been crystallized in both tetrahedral and square planar geometries.

== Ligand field theory vs crystal field theory ==
In terms of d-orbital splitting, ligand field theory (LFT) and crystal field theory (CFT) give similar results. CFT is an older, simpler model that treats ligands as point charges. LFT is more chemical, emphasizes covalent bonding and accommodates pi-bonding explicitly.

== High-spin and low-spin systems ==
In the case of octahedral complexes, the question of high spin vs low spin first arises for d^{4}, since it has more than the 3 electrons to fill the non-bonding d orbitals according to ligand field theory or the stabilized d orbitals according to crystal field splitting.

All complexes of second and third row metals are low-spin.

d^{4}
Octahedral high-spin: 4 unpaired electrons, paramagnetic, substitutionally labile. Includes Cr^{2+} (many complexes assigned as Cr(II) are however Cr(III) with reduced ligands), Mn^{3+}.
Octahedral low-spin: 2 unpaired electrons, paramagnetic, substitutionally inert. Includes Cr^{2+}, Mn^{3+}.

d^{5}
Octahedral high-spin: 5 unpaired electrons, paramagnetic, substitutionally labile. Includes Fe^{3+}, Mn^{2+}. Example: Tris(acetylacetonato)iron(III).
Octahedral low-spin: 1 unpaired electron, paramagnetic, substitutionally inert. Includes Fe^{3+}. Example: [Fe(CN)_{6}]^{3−}.

d^{6}
Octahedral high-spin: 4 unpaired electrons, paramagnetic, substitutionally labile. Includes Fe^{2+}, Co^{3+}. Examples: [Fe(H_{2}O)_{6}]^{2+}, [CoF_{6}]^{3−}.
Octahedral low-spin: no unpaired electrons, diamagnetic, substitutionally inert. Includes Fe^{2+}, Co^{3+}, Ni^{4+}. Example: [Co(NH_{3})_{6}]^{3+}.

d^{7}
Octahedral high-spin: 3 unpaired electrons, paramagnetic, substitutionally labile. Includes Co^{2+}, Ni^{3+}.
Octahedral low-spin:1 unpaired electron, paramagnetic, substitutionally labile. Includes Co^{2+}, Ni^{3+}. Example: [Co(NH_{3})_{6}]^{2+}.

d^{8}
Octahedral high-spin: 2 unpaired electrons, paramagnetic, substitutionally labile. Includes Ni^{2+}. Example: [Ni(NH_{3})_{6}]^{2+}.
Tetrahedral high-spin: 2 unpaired electrons, paramagnetic, substitutionally labile. Includes Ni^{2+}. Example: [NiCl_{4}]^{2-}.
Square planar low-spin: no unpaired electrons, diamagnetic, substitutionally inert. Includes Ni^{2+}. Example: [Ni(CN)_{4}]^{2−}.

=== Ionic radii ===
The spin state of the complex affects an atom's ionic radius. For a given d-electron count, high-spin complexes are larger.

d^{4}
Octahedral high spin: Cr^{2+}, 64.5 pm.
Octahedral low spin: Mn^{3+}, 58 pm.

d^{5}
Octahedral high spin: Fe^{3+}, the ionic radius is 64.5 pm.
Octahedral low spin: Fe^{3+}, the ionic radius is 55 pm.

d^{6}
Octahedral high spin: Fe^{2+}, the ionic radius is 78 pm, Co^{3+} ionic radius 61 pm.
Octahedral low spin: Includes Fe^{2+} ionic radius 62 pm, Co^{3+} ionic radius 54.5 pm, Ni^{4+} ionic radius 48 pm.

d^{7}
Octahedral high spin: Co^{2+} ionic radius 74.5 pm, Ni^{3+} ionic radius 60 pm.
Octahedral low spin: Co^{2+} ionic radius 65 pm, Ni^{3+}ionic radius 56 pm.

d^{8}
Octahedral high spin: Ni^{2+} ionic radius 69 pm.
Square planar low-spin: Ni^{2+} ionic radius 49 pm.

== Ligand exchange rates ==
Generally, the rates of ligand dissociation from low spin complexes are lower than dissociation rates from high spin complexes. In the case of octahedral complexes, electrons in the e_{g} levels are anti-bonding with respect to the metal-ligand bonds. Famous "exchange inert" complexes are octahedral complexes of d^{3} and low-spin d^{6} metal ions, illustrated respectively by Cr^{3+} and Co^{3+}.
