= Spectrochemical series =

List of ligands in coordination compounds topic of Inorganic chemistry

A spectrochemical series is a list of ligands ordered by ligand "strength", and a list of metal ions based on oxidation number, group and element. For a metal ion, the ligands modify the difference in energy Δ between the d orbitals, called the ligand-field splitting parameter in ligand field theory, or the crystal-field splitting parameter in crystal field theory. The splitting parameter is reflected in the ion's electronic and magnetic properties such as its spin state, and optical properties such as its color and absorption spectrum.

== Spectrochemical series of ligands ==
The spectrochemical series was first proposed in 1938 based on the results of absorption spectra of cobalt complexes.

A partial spectrochemical series listing ligands from small Δ to large Δ is given below. (For a table, see the ligand page.)

I^{−} < Br^{−} < S^{2−} < SCN^{−} (S–bonded) < Cl^{−} < NO_{3}^{–} < N_{3}^{−} < F^{−} < OH^{−} < H_{2}O <C_{2}O_{4}^{2−} < NCS^{−} (N–bonded) < CH_{3}CN < py (pyridine) < NH_{3} < en (ethylenediamine) < bipy (2,2'-bipyridine) < phen (1,10-phenanthroline) < NO_{2}^{−} (N–bonded) < PPh_{3} (Triphenylphosphine) < CN^{−} < CO

Examples of weak field ligands: H_{2}O, F^{−}, Cl^{−}, OH^{−}

Examples of strong field ligands: CO, CN^{−}, NH_{3}, PPh_{3}

Ligands arranged on the left end of this spectrochemical series are generally regarded as weaker ligands and cannot cause forcible pairing of electrons within the 3d level, and thus form outer orbital octahedral complexes that are high spin. Ligands to the right of the series are stronger ligands and form inner orbital octahedral complexes after forcible pairing of electrons within 3d level and hence are called low spin ligands.

However, it is known that "the spectrochemical series is essentially backwards from what it should be for a reasonable prediction based on the assumptions of crystal field theory." This deviation from crystal field theory highlights the weakness of its assumption of purely ionic bonds between metal and ligand.

The order of the spectrochemical series can be derived from the understanding that ligands are frequently classified by their donor or acceptor abilities. Some, like NH_{3}, are σ bond donors only, with no orbitals of appropriate symmetry for π bonding interactions. Bonding of these ligands to metals is relatively simple, using only the σ bonds to create relatively weak interactions. Another example of a σ bonding ligand would be ethylenediamine; however, ethylenediamine has a stronger effect than ammonia, generating a larger ligand field split, Δ.

Ligands that have occupied p orbitals are potentially π donors. These types of ligands tend to donate these electrons to the metal along with the σ bonding electrons, exhibiting stronger metal-ligand interactions and an effective decrease of Δ. Halide ligands are primary examples of π donor ligands, along with OH^{−}.

When ligands have vacant π* and d orbitals of suitable energy, there is the possibility of pi backbonding, and the ligands may be π acceptors. This addition to the bonding scheme increases Δ. Ligands such as CN^{−} and CO do this very effectively.

== Spectrochemical series of metals ==
Metal ions can also be arranged in order of increasing Δ; this order is largely independent of the identity of the ligand.

Mn^{2+} < Ni^{2+} < Co^{2+} < Fe^{2+} < V^{2+} < Fe^{3+} < Cr^{3+} < V^{3+} < Co^{3+}

In general, it is not possible to say whether a given ligand will exert a strong field or a weak field on a given metal ion. However, when we consider the metal ion, the following two useful trends are observed:

- Δ increases with increasing oxidation number, and
- Δ increases down a group.

== See also ==
- Nephelauxetic effect – Term in the chemistry of transition metals
