= Slater integrals =

In mathematics and mathematical physics, Slater integrals are certain integrals of products of three spherical harmonics. They occur naturally when applying an orthonormal basis of functions on the unit sphere that transform in a particular way under rotations in three dimensions. Such integrals are particularly useful when computing properties of atoms which have natural spherical symmetry. These integrals are defined below along with some of their mathematical properties.

== Formulation ==
In connection with the quantum theory of atomic structure, John C. Slater defined the integral of three spherical harmonics as a coefficient $c$. These coefficients are essentially the product of two Wigner 3jm symbols.

$$c^k(\ell,m,\ell',m')=\int d^2\Omega \ Y_\ell^m(\Omega)^* Y_{\ell'}^{m'}(\Omega) Y_k^{m-m'}(\Omega)$$

These integrals are useful and necessary when doing atomic calculations of the Hartree–Fock variety where matrix elements of the Coulomb operator and Exchange operator are needed. For an explicit formula, one can use Gaunt's formula for associated Legendre polynomials.

Note that the product of two spherical harmonics can be written in terms of these coefficients. By expanding such a product over a spherical harmonic basis with the same order

$$Y_\ell^m Y_{\ell'}^{m'} = \sum_{\ell''} \hat{A}^{\ell''}(\ell,m,\ell',m',) Y_{\ell''}^{m+m'},$$

one may then multiply by $Y^*$ and integrate, using the conjugate property and being careful with phases and normalisations:

$$\int Y_\ell^m Y_{\ell'}^{m'} Y_{L}^{-M} d^2\Omega = (-1)^{m+m'}\hat{A}^{L}(\ell,m,\ell',m') = (-1)^{m}c^L(\ell,-m,\ell',m').$$

Hence

$$Y_\ell^m Y_{\ell'}^{m'} = \sum_{\ell''}(-1)^{m'} c^{\ell''}(\ell,-m,\ell',m',) Y_{\ell''}^{m+m'},$$

These coefficient obey a number of identities. They include

$$\begin{align}
c^k(\ell,m,\ell',m') &= c^k(\ell,-m,\ell',-m')\\
&=(-1)^{m-m'}c^k(\ell',m',\ell,m)\\
&=(-1)^{m-m'}\sqrt{\frac{2\ell+1}{2k+1}}c^\ell(\ell',m',k,m'-m)\\
& = (-1)^{m'}\sqrt{\frac{2\ell'+1}{2k+1}}c^{\ell'}(k,m-m',\ell,m).\\
\sum_{m=-\ell}^{\ell} c^k(\ell,m,\ell,m)  &=  (2\ell+1)\delta_{k,0}.\\
\sum_{m=-\ell}^\ell \sum_{m'=-\ell'}^{\ell'} c^k(\ell,m,\ell',m')^2  &=  \sqrt{(2\ell+1)(2\ell'+1)}\cdot c^k(\ell,0,\ell',0).\\
\sum_{m=-\ell}^\ell c^k(\ell,m,\ell',m')^2 & =  \sqrt{\frac{2\ell+1}{2\ell'+1}}\cdot c^k(\ell,0,\ell',0).\\
\sum_{m=-\ell}^\ell c^k(\ell,m,\ell',m')c^k(\ell,m,\tilde\ell,m')  &=  \delta_{\ell',\tilde\ell}\cdot\sqrt{\frac{2\ell+1}{2\ell'+1}}\cdot c^k(\ell,0,\ell',0).\\
\sum_m c^k(\ell,m+r,\ell',m) c^k(\ell,m+r,\tilde\ell,m)  &=  \delta_{\ell,\tilde\ell} \cdot \frac{\sqrt{(2\ell+1)(2\ell'+1)}}{2k+1}\cdot c^k(\ell,0,\ell',0).\\
\sum_m c^k(\ell,m+r,\ell',m)c^q(\ell,m+r,\ell',m)  &= \delta_{k,q}\cdot\frac{\sqrt{(2\ell+1)(2\ell'+1)}}{2k+1}\cdot c^k(\ell,0,\ell',0).
\end{align}$$
