= Transition metal =

Series of chemical elements

In chemistry, a transition metal (or transition element) is a chemical element in the d-block of the periodic table (groups 3 to 12), though the elements of group 12 (and less often group 3) are sometimes excluded. The lanthanide and actinide elements (the f-block) are called inner transition metals and are sometimes considered to be transition metals as well.

They are lustrous metals with good electrical and thermal conductivity. Most (with the exception of group 11 and group 12) are hard and strong, and have high melting and boiling temperatures. They form compounds in any of two or more different oxidation states and bind to a variety of ligands to form coordination complexes that are often coloured. They form many useful alloys and are often employed as catalysts in elemental form or in compounds such as coordination complexes and oxides. Most are strongly paramagnetic because of their unpaired d electrons, as are many of their compounds. All of the elements that are ferromagnetic near room temperature are transition metals (iron, cobalt and nickel) or inner transition metals (gadolinium).

English chemist Charles Rugeley Bury (1890–1968) first used the word transition in this context in 1921, when he referred to a transition series of elements during the change of an inner layer of electrons (for example n = 3 in the 4th row of the periodic table) from a stable group of 8 to one of 18, or from 18 to 32. These elements are now known as the d-block.

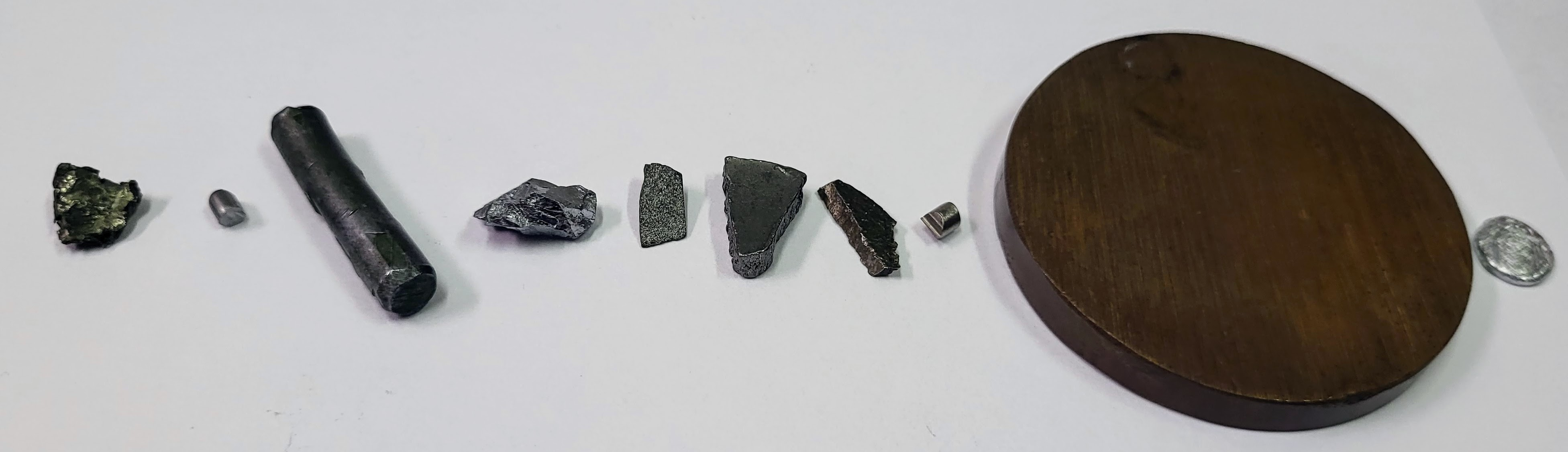
The first row of transition metals, in order

== Definition and classification ==
The 2011 IUPAC Principles of Chemical Nomenclature describe a "transition metal" as any element in groups 3 to 12 on the periodic table. This corresponds exactly to the d-block elements, and many scientists use this definition. In actual practice, the f-block lanthanide and actinide series are called "inner transition metals". The 2005 Red Book allows for the group 12 elements to be excluded, but not the 2011 Principles.

The IUPAC Gold Book defines a transition metal as "an element whose atom has a partially filled d sub-shell, or which can give rise to cations with an incomplete d sub-shell", but this definition is taken from an old edition of the Red Book and is no longer present in the current edition.

In the d-block, the atoms of the elements have between zero and ten d electrons.

Transition metals in the d-block
Group	3	4	5	6	7	8	9	10	11	12
Period 4	_{21}Sc	_{22}Ti	_{23}V	_{24}Cr	_{25}Mn	_{26}Fe	_{27}Co	_{28}Ni	_{29}Cu	_{30}Zn
5	_{39}Y	_{40}Zr	_{41}Nb	_{42}Mo	_{43}Tc	_{44}Ru	_{45}Rh	_{46}Pd	_{47}Ag	_{48}Cd
6	_{71}Lu	_{72}Hf	_{73}Ta	_{74}W	_{75}Re	_{76}Os	_{77}Ir	_{78}Pt	_{79}Au	_{80}Hg
7	_{103}Lr	_{104}Rf	_{105}Db	_{106}Sg	_{107}Bh	_{108}Hs	_{109}Mt	_{110}Ds	_{111}Rg	_{112}Cn

Published texts and periodic tables show variation regarding the heavier members of group 3. The common placement of lanthanum and actinium in these positions is not supported by physical, chemical, and electronic evidence, which overwhelmingly favour putting lutetium and lawrencium in those places. Some authors prefer to leave the spaces below yttrium blank as a third option, but there is confusion on whether this format implies that group 3 contains only scandium and yttrium, or if it also contains all the lanthanides and actinides; additionally, it creates a 15-element-wide f-block, when quantum mechanics dictates that the f-block should only be 14 elements wide. The form with lutetium and lawrencium in group 3 is supported by a 1988 IUPAC report on physical, chemical, and electronic grounds, and again by a 2021 IUPAC preliminary report as it is the only form that allows simultaneous (1) preservation of the sequence of increasing atomic numbers, (2) a 14-element-wide f-block, and (3) avoidance of the split in the d-block. Argumentation can still be found in the contemporary literature purporting to defend the form with lanthanum and actinium in group 3, but many authors consider it to be logically inconsistent (a particular point of contention being the differing treatment of actinium and thorium, which both can use 5f as a valence orbital but have no 5f occupancy as single atoms); the majority of investigators considering the problem agree with the updated form with lutetium and lawrencium.

The group 12 elements zinc, cadmium, and mercury are sometimes excluded from the transition metals. This is because they have the electronic configuration [ ]d^{10}s^{2}, where the d shell is complete, and they still have a complete d shell in all their known oxidation states. The group 12 elements Zn, Cd and Hg may therefore, under certain criteria, be classed as post-transition metals in this case. However, it is often convenient to include these elements in a discussion of the transition elements. For example, when discussing the crystal field stabilization energy of first-row transition elements, it is convenient to also include the elements calcium and zinc, as both Ca^{2+} and Zn^{2+} have a value of zero, against which the value for other transition metal ions may be compared. Another example occurs in the Irving–Williams series of stability constants of complexes. Moreover, Zn, Cd, and Hg can use their d orbitals for bonding even though they are not known in oxidation states that would formally require breaking open the d-subshell, which sets them apart from the p-block elements.

The 2007 (though disputed and so far not reproduced independently) synthesis of mercury(IV) fluoride (HgF_{4}) has been taken by some to reinforce the view that the group 12 elements should be considered transition metals, but some authors still consider this compound to be exceptional. Copernicium is expected to be able to use its d electrons for chemistry as its 6d subshell is destabilised by strong relativistic effects due to its very high atomic number, and as such is expected to have transition-metal-like behaviour and show higher oxidation states than +2 (which are not definitely known for the lighter group 12 elements). Even in bare dications, Cn^{2+} is predicted to be 6d^{8}7s^{2}, unlike Hg^{2+} which is 5d^{10}6s^{0}.

Although meitnerium, darmstadtium, and roentgenium are within the d-block and are expected to behave as transition metals analogous to their lighter congeners iridium, platinum, and gold, this has not yet been experimentally confirmed. Whether copernicium behaves more like mercury or has properties more similar to those of the noble gas radon is not clear. Relative inertness of Cn would come from the relativistically expanded 7s–7p_{1/2} energy gap, which is already adumbrated in the 6s–6p_{1/2} gap for Hg, weakening metallic bonding and causing its well-known low melting and boiling points.

Transition metals with lower or higher group numbers are described as 'earlier' or 'later', respectively. When described in a two-way classification scheme, early transition metals are on the left side of the d-block from group 3 to group 7. Late transition metals are on the right side of the d-block, from group 8 to 11 (or 12, if they are counted as transition metals). In an alternative three-way scheme, groups 3, 4, and 5 are classified as early transition metals, 6, 7, and 8 are classified as middle transition metals, and 9, 10, and 11 (and sometimes group 12) are classified as late transition metals.

The heavy group 2 elements calcium, strontium, and barium do not have filled d-orbitals as single atoms, but are known to have d-orbital bonding participation in some compounds, and for that reason have been called "honorary" transition metals. The same is likely true of radium.

The f-block elements La–Yb and Ac–No have chemical activity of the (n−1)d shell, but importantly also have chemical activity of the (n−2)f shell that is absent in d-block elements. Hence they are often treated separately as inner transition elements.

== Electronic configuration ==
The general electronic configuration of the d-block atoms is [noble gas](n − 1)d^{0–10}ns^{0–2}np^{0–1}. Here "[noble gas]" is the electronic configuration of the last noble gas preceding the atom in question, and n is the highest principal quantum number of an occupied orbital in that atom. For example, Ti (Z = 22) is in period 4 so that n = 4, the first 18 electrons have the same configuration of Ar at the end of period 3, and the overall configuration is [Ar]3d^{2}4s^{2}. The period 6 and 7 transition metals also add core (n − 2)f^{14} electrons, which are omitted from the tables below. The p orbitals are almost never filled in free atoms (the one exception being lawrencium due to relativistic effects that become important at such high Z), but they can contribute to the chemical bonding in transition metal compounds.

The Madelung rule predicts that the inner d orbital is filled after the valence-shell s orbital. The typical electronic structure of transition metal atoms is then written as [noble gas]ns^{2}(n − 1)d^{m}. This rule is approximate, but holds for most of the transition metals. Even when it fails for the neutral ground state, it accurately describes a low-lying excited state.

The d subshell is the next-to-last subshell and is denoted as (n − 1)d subshell. The number of s electrons in the outermost s subshell is generally one or two except palladium (Pd), with no electron in that s sub shell in its ground state. The s subshell in the valence shell is represented as the ns subshell, e.g. 4s. In the periodic table, the transition metals are present in ten groups (3 to 12).

The elements in group 3 have an ns^{2}(n − 1)d^{1} configuration, except for lawrencium (Lr): its 7s^{2}7p^{1} configuration exceptionally does not fill the 6d orbitals at all. The first transition series is present in the 4th period, and starts after Ca (Z = 20) of group 2 with the configuration [Ar]4s^{2}, or scandium (Sc), the first element of group 3 with atomic number Z = 21 and configuration [Ar]4s^{2}3d^{1}, depending on the definition used. As we move from left to right, electrons are added to the same d subshell till it is complete. Since the electrons added fill the (n − 1)d orbitals, the properties of the d-block elements are quite different from those of s and p block elements in which the filling occurs either in s or in p orbitals of the valence shell. The electronic configuration of the individual elements present in all the d-block series are given below:

First (3d) d-block Series (Sc–Zn)
Group	3	4	5	6	7	8	9	10	11	12
Atomic number	21	22	23	24	25	26	27	28	29	30
Element	Sc	Ti	V	Cr	Mn	Fe	Co	Ni	Cu	Zn
Electron configuration	3d^{1}4s^{2}	3d^{2}4s^{2}	3d^{3}4s^{2}	3d^{5}4s^{1}	3d^{5}4s^{2}	3d^{6}4s^{2}	3d^{7}4s^{2}	3d^{8}4s^{2}	3d^{10}4s^{1}	3d^{10}4s^{2}

Second (4d) d-block Series (Y–Cd)
Atomic number	39	40	41	42	43	44	45	46	47	48
Element	Y	Zr	Nb	Mo	Tc	Ru	Rh	Pd	Ag	Cd
Electron configuration	4d^{1}5s^{2}	4d^{2}5s^{2}	4d^{4}5s^{1}	4d^{5}5s^{1}	4d^{5}5s^{2}	4d^{7}5s^{1}	4d^{8}5s^{1}	4d^{10}5s^{0}	4d^{10}5s^{1}	4d^{10}5s^{2}

Third (5d) d-block Series (Lu–Hg)
Atomic number	71	72	73	74	75	76	77	78	79	80
Element	Lu	Hf	Ta	W	Re	Os	Ir	Pt	Au	Hg
Electron configuration	5d^{1}6s^{2}	5d^{2}6s^{2}	5d^{3}6s^{2}	5d^{4}6s^{2}	5d^{5}6s^{2}	5d^{6}6s^{2}	5d^{7}6s^{2}	5d^{9}6s^{1}	5d^{10}6s^{1}	5d^{10}6s^{2}

Fourth (6d) d-block Series (Lr–Cn) (Configurations predicted for Mt–Cn)
Atomic number	103	104	105	106	107	108	109	110	111	112
Element	Lr	Rf	Db	Sg	Bh	Hs	Mt	Ds	Rg	Cn
Electron configuration	7s^{2}7p^{1}	6d^{2}7s^{2}	6d^{3}7s^{2}	6d^{4}7s^{2}	6d^{5}7s^{2}	6d^{6}7s^{2}	6d^{7}7s^{2}	6d^{8}7s^{2}	6d^{9}7s^{2}	6d^{10}7s^{2}

A careful look at the electronic configuration of the elements reveals that there are certain exceptions to the Madelung rule. For Cr as an example the rule predicts the configuration 3d^{4}4s^{2}, but the observed atomic spectra show that the real ground state is 3d^{5}4s^{1}. To explain such exceptions, it is necessary to consider the effects of increasing nuclear charge on the orbital energies, as well as the electron–electron interactions including both Coulomb repulsion and exchange energy. The exceptions are in any case not very relevant for chemistry because the energy difference between them and the expected configuration is always quite low.

The (n − 1)d orbitals that are involved in the transition metals are very significant because they influence such properties as magnetic character, variable oxidation states, formation of coloured compounds etc. The valence s and p orbitals (ns and np) have very little contribution in this regard since they hardly change in the moving from left to the right in a transition series. In transition metals, there are greater horizontal similarities in the properties of the elements in a period in comparison to the periods in which the d orbitals are not involved. This is because in a transition series, the valence shell electronic configuration of the elements do not change. However, there are some group similarities as well.

== Characteristic properties ==
There are a number of properties shared by the transition elements that are not found in other elements, which results from the partially filled d shell. These include

- the formation of compounds whose colour is due to d–d electronic transitions
- the formation of compounds in many oxidation states, due to the relatively low energy gap between different possible oxidation states
- the formation of many paramagnetic compounds due to the presence of unpaired d electrons. A few compounds of main-group elements are also paramagnetic (e.g. nitric oxide, oxygen)

Most transition metals can be bound to a variety of ligands, allowing for a wide variety of transition metal complexes.

=== Coloured compounds ===
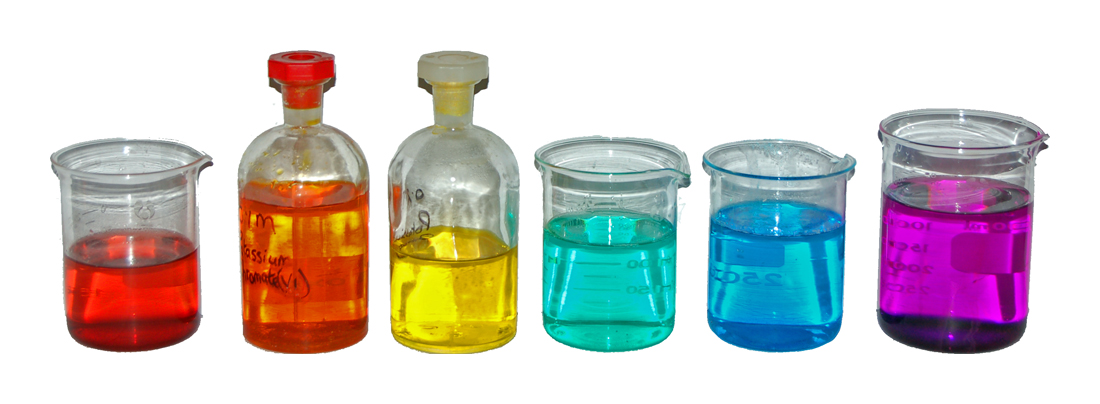
From left to right, aqueous solutions of: Co(NO_{3})_{2} (red); K_{2}Cr_{2}O_{7} (orange); K_{2}CrO_{4} (yellow); NiCl_{2} (turquoise); CuSO_{4} (blue); KMnO_{4} (purple).

Colour in transition-series metal compounds is generally due to electronic transitions of two principal types.

- charge transfer transitions. An electron may jump from a predominantly ligand orbital to a predominantly metal orbital, giving rise to a ligand-to-metal charge-transfer (LMCT) transition. These can most easily occur when the metal is in a high oxidation state. For example, the colour of chromate, dichromate and permanganate ions is due to LMCT transitions. Another example is that mercuric iodide, HgI_{2}, is red because of a LMCT transition.

A metal-to-ligand charge transfer (MLCT) transition will be most likely when the metal is in a low oxidation state and the ligand is easily reduced.

In general charge transfer transitions result in more intense colours than d–d transitions.

- d–d transitions. An electron jumps from one d orbital to another. In complexes of the transition metals the d orbitals do not all have the same energy. The pattern of splitting of the d orbitals can be calculated using crystal field theory. The extent of the splitting depends on the particular metal, its oxidation state and the nature of the ligands. The actual energy levels are shown on Tanabe–Sugano diagrams.

In centrosymmetric complexes, such as octahedral complexes, d–d transitions are forbidden by the Laporte rule and only occur because of vibronic coupling in which a molecular vibration occurs together with a d–d transition. Tetrahedral complexes have somewhat more intense colour because mixing d and p orbitals is possible when there is no centre of symmetry, so transitions are not pure d–d transitions. The molar absorptivity (ε) of bands caused by d–d transitions are relatively low, roughly in the range 5–500 M^{−1}cm^{−1} (where M = mol dm^{−3}). Some d–d transitions are spin forbidden. An example occurs in octahedral, high-spin complexes of manganese(II), which has a d^{5} configuration in which all five electrons have parallel spins; the colour of such complexes is much weaker than in complexes with spin-allowed transitions. Many compounds of manganese(II) appear almost colourless. The spectrum of [Mn(H_{2}O)_{6}]^{2+} shows a maximum molar absorptivity of about 0.04 M^{−1}cm^{−1} in the visible spectrum.

=== Oxidation states ===
A characteristic of transition metals is that they exhibit two or more oxidation states, usually differing by one. For example, compounds of vanadium are known in all oxidation states between −1, such as [V(CO)_{6}]^{−}, and +5, such as VO^{3−}_{4}.

Oxidation states of the transition metals. The solid dots show common oxidation states, and the hollow dots show possible but unlikely states.

Main-group elements in groups 13 to 18 also exhibit multiple oxidation states. The "common" oxidation states of these elements typically differ by two instead of one. For example, compounds of gallium in oxidation states +1 and +3 exist in which there is a single gallium atom. Compounds of Ga(II) would have an unpaired electron and would behave as a free radical and generally be destroyed rapidly, but some stable radicals of Ga(II) are known. Gallium also has a formal oxidation state of +2 in dimeric compounds, such as [Ga_{2}Cl_{6}]^{2−}, which contain a Ga-Ga bond formed from the unpaired electron on each Ga atom. Thus the main difference in oxidation states, between transition elements and other elements is that oxidation states are known in which there is a single atom of the element and one or more unpaired electrons.

The maximum oxidation state in the first row transition metals is equal to the number of valence electrons from titanium (+4) up to manganese (+7), but decreases in the later elements. In the second row, the maximum occurs with ruthenium (+8), and in the third row, the maximum occurs with iridium (+9). In compounds such as [MnO_{4}]^{−} and OsO_{4}, the elements achieve a stable configuration by covalent bonding.

The lowest oxidation states are exhibited in metal carbonyl complexes such as Cr(CO)_{6} (oxidation state zero) and [Fe(CO)_{4}]^{2−} (oxidation state −2) in which the 18-electron rule is obeyed. These complexes are also covalent.

Ionic compounds are mostly formed with oxidation states +2 and +3. In aqueous solution, the ions are hydrated by (usually) six water molecules arranged octahedrally.

=== Magnetism ===
Transition metal compounds are paramagnetic when they have one or more unpaired d electrons. In octahedral complexes with between four and seven d electrons both high spin and low spin states are possible. Tetrahedral transition metal complexes such as [FeCl_{4}]^{2−} are high spin because the crystal field splitting is small so that the energy to be gained by virtue of the electrons being in lower energy orbitals is always less than the energy needed to pair up the spins. Some compounds are diamagnetic. These include octahedral, low-spin, d^{6} and square-planar d^{8} complexes. In these cases, crystal field splitting is such that all the electrons are paired up.

Ferromagnetism occurs when individual atoms are paramagnetic and the spin vectors are aligned parallel to each other in a crystalline material. Metallic iron and the alloy alnico are examples of ferromagnetic materials involving transition metals. Antiferromagnetism is another example of a magnetic property arising from a particular alignment of individual spins in the solid state.

=== Catalytic properties ===
The transition metals and their compounds are known for their homogeneous and heterogeneous catalytic activity. This activity is ascribed to their ability to adopt multiple oxidation states and to form complexes. Vanadium(V) oxide (in the contact process), finely divided iron (in the Haber process), and nickel (in catalytic hydrogenation) are some of the examples. Catalysts at a solid surface (nanomaterial-based catalysts) involve the formation of bonds between reactant molecules and atoms of the surface of the catalyst (first row transition metals utilize 3d and 4s electrons for bonding). This has the effect of increasing the concentration of the reactants at the catalyst surface and also weakening of the bonds in the reacting molecules (the activation energy is lowered). Also because the transition metal ions can change their oxidation states, they become more effective as catalysts.

An interesting type of catalysis occurs when the products of a reaction catalyse the reaction producing more catalyst (autocatalysis). One example is the reaction of oxalic acid with acidified potassium permanganate (or manganate (VII)). Once a little Mn^{2+} has been produced, it can react with MnO_{4}^{−} forming Mn^{3+}. This then reacts with C_{2}O_{4}^{−} ions forming Mn^{2+} again.

=== Physical properties ===
As implied by the name, all transition metals are metals and thus conductors of electricity.

In general, transition metals possess a high density and high melting points and boiling points. These properties are due to metallic bonding by delocalized d electrons, leading to cohesion which increases with the number of shared electrons. However the group 12 metals have much lower melting and boiling points since their full d subshells prevent d–d bonding, which again tends to differentiate them from the accepted transition metals. Mercury has a melting point of −38.83 °C (−37.89 °F) and is a liquid at room temperature.

== See also ==
- Inner transition element, a name given to any member of the f-block
- Main-group element, an element other than a transition metal
- Ligand field theory a development of crystal field theory taking covalency into account
- Crystal field theory a model that describes the breaking of degeneracies of electronic orbital states
- Post-transition metal, a metallic element to the right of the transition metals in the periodic table
