= Ligand field theory =

Molecular orbital theory applied to transition metal complexes

Ligand field theory (LFT) describes the bonding, orbital arrangement, and other characteristics of coordination complexes. It represents an application of molecular orbital theory to transition metal complexes. A transition metal ion has nine valence atomic orbitals - consisting of five nd, one (n+1)s, and three (n+1)p orbitals. These orbitals have the appropriate energy to form bonding interactions with ligands. The LFT analysis is highly dependent on the geometry of the complex, but most explanations begin by describing octahedral complexes, where six ligands coordinate with the metal. Other complexes can be described with reference to crystal field theory. Inverted ligand field theory (ILFT) elaborates on LFT by breaking assumptions made about relative metal and ligand orbital energies.

== History ==
Ligand field theory resulted from combining the principles laid out in molecular orbital theory and crystal field theory, which describe the loss of degeneracy of metal d orbitals in transition metal complexes. John Stanley Griffith and Leslie Orgel championed ligand field theory as a more accurate description of such complexes, although the theory originated in the 1930s with the work on magnetism by John Hasbrouck Van Vleck. Griffith and Orgel used the electrostatic principles established in crystal field theory to describe transition metal ions in solution and used molecular orbital theory to explain the differences in metal-ligand interactions, thereby explaining such observations as crystal field stabilization and visible spectra of transition metal complexes. In their paper, they proposed that the chief cause of color differences in transition metal complexes in solution is the incomplete d orbital subshells. That is, the unoccupied d orbitals of transition metals participate in bonding, which influences the colors they absorb in solution. In ligand field theory, the various d orbitals are affected differently when surrounded by a field of neighboring ligands and are raised or lowered in energy based on the strength of their interaction with the ligands.

== Bonding ==
=== σ-bonding (sigma bonding) ===
In an octahedral complex, the molecular orbitals created by coordination can be seen as resulting from the donation of two electrons by each of six σ-donor ligands to the d-orbitals on the metal. In octahedral complexes, ligands approach along the x-, y- and z-axes, so their σ-symmetry orbitals form bonding and anti-bonding combinations with the d_{z^{2}} and d_{x^{2}−y^{2}} orbitals. The d_{xy}, d_{xz} and d_{yz} orbitals remain non-bonding orbitals. Some weak bonding (and anti-bonding) interactions with the s and p orbitals of the metal also occur, to make a total of 6 bonding (and 6 anti-bonding) molecular orbitals

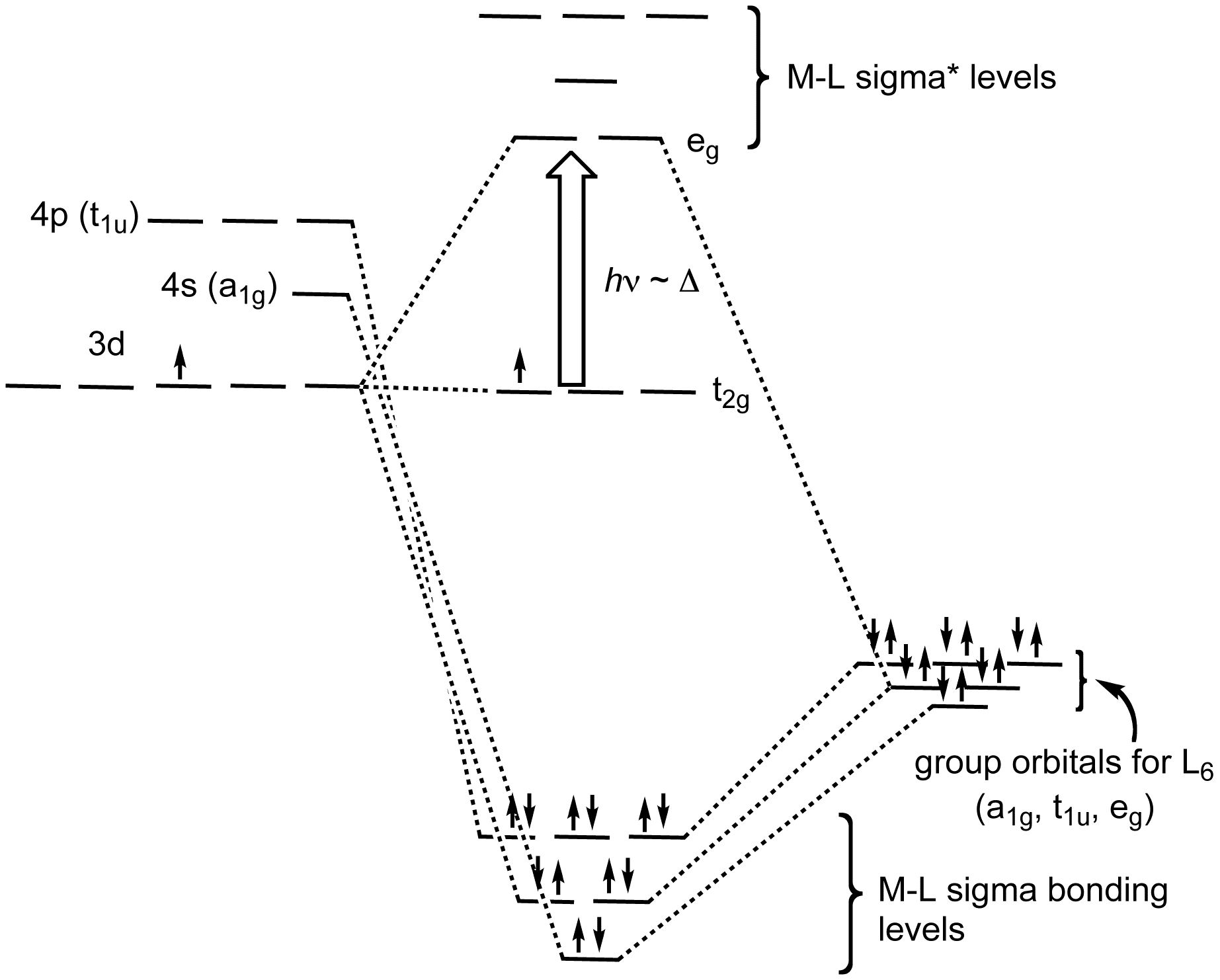
Ligand-Field scheme summarizing σ-bonding in the octahedral complex [Ti(H_{2}O)_{6}]^{3+}.

In molecular symmetry terms, the six lone-pair orbitals from the ligands (one from each ligand) form six symmetry-adapted linear combinations (SALCs) of orbitals, also sometimes called ligand group orbitals (LGOs). The irreducible representations that these span are a_{1g}, t_{1u} and e_{g}. The metal also has six valence orbitals that span these irreducible representations - the s orbital is labeled a_{1g}, a set of three p-orbitals is labeled t_{1u}, and the d_{z^{2}} and d_{x^{2}−y^{2}} orbitals are labeled e_{g}. The six σ-bonding molecular orbitals result from the combinations of ligand SALCs with metal orbitals of the same symmetry.

=== π-bonding (pi bonding) ===
π bonding in octahedral complexes occurs in two ways: via any ligand p-orbitals that are not being used in σ bonding, and via any π or π^{*} molecular orbitals present on the ligand.

In the usual analysis, the p-orbitals of the metal are used for σ bonding (and have the wrong symmetry to overlap with the ligand p or π or π^{*} orbitals anyway), so the π interactions take place with the appropriate metal d-orbitals, i.e. d_{xy}, d_{xz} and d_{yz}. These are the orbitals that are non-bonding when only σ bonding takes place.

Example of π backbonding with carbonyl (CO) ligands.

One important π bonding in coordination complexes is metal-to-ligand π bonding, also called π backbonding. It occurs when the LUMOs (lowest unoccupied molecular orbitals) of the ligand are anti-bonding π^{*} orbitals. These orbitals are close in energy to the d_{xy}, d_{xz} and d_{yz} orbitals, with which they combine to form bonding orbitals (i.e. orbitals of lower energy than the aforementioned set of d-orbitals). The corresponding anti-bonding orbitals are higher in energy than the anti-bonding orbitals from σ bonding so, after the new π bonding orbitals are filled with electrons from the metal d-orbitals, Δ_{O} has increased and the bond between the ligand and the metal strengthens. The ligands end up with electrons in their π^{*} molecular orbital, so the corresponding π bond within the ligand weakens.

The other form of coordination π bonding is ligand-to-metal bonding. This situation arises when the π-symmetry p or π orbitals on the ligands are filled. They combine with the d_{xy}, d_{xz} and d_{yz} orbitals on the metal and donate electrons to the resulting π-symmetry bonding orbital between them and the metal. The metal-ligand bond is somewhat strengthened by this interaction, but the complementary anti-bonding molecular orbital from ligand-to-metal bonding is not higher in energy than the anti-bonding molecular orbital from the σ bonding. It is filled with electrons from the metal d-orbitals, however, becoming the HOMO (highest occupied molecular orbital) of the complex. For that reason, Δ_{O} decreases when ligand-to-metal bonding occurs.

The greater stabilization that results from metal-to-ligand bonding is caused by the donation of negative charge away from the metal ion, towards the ligands. This allows the metal to accept the σ bonds more easily. The combination of ligand-to-metal σ-bonding and metal-to-ligand π-bonding is a synergic effect, as each enhances the other.

As each of the six ligands has two orbitals of π-symmetry, there are twelve in total. The symmetry adapted linear combinations of these fall into four triply degenerate irreducible representations, one of which is of t_{2g} symmetry. The d_{xy}, d_{xz} and d_{yz} orbitals on the metal also have this symmetry, and so the π-bonds formed between a central metal and six ligands also have it (as these π-bonds are just formed by the overlap of two sets of orbitals with t_{2g} symmetry.)

Crystal Field Splitting in Octahedral and Tetrahedral Complexes

Crystal field theory (CFT) describes how the presence of surrounding ligands affects the energy of the d orbitals in a transition metal ion. In an isolated metal ion, the five d orbitals are degenerate meaning they are equal in energy. However, when ligands approach the metal center, electrostatic interactions between the ligand electron pairs and the metal d orbitals break degeneracy, which results in the splitting of energy levels.

Octahedral Complex

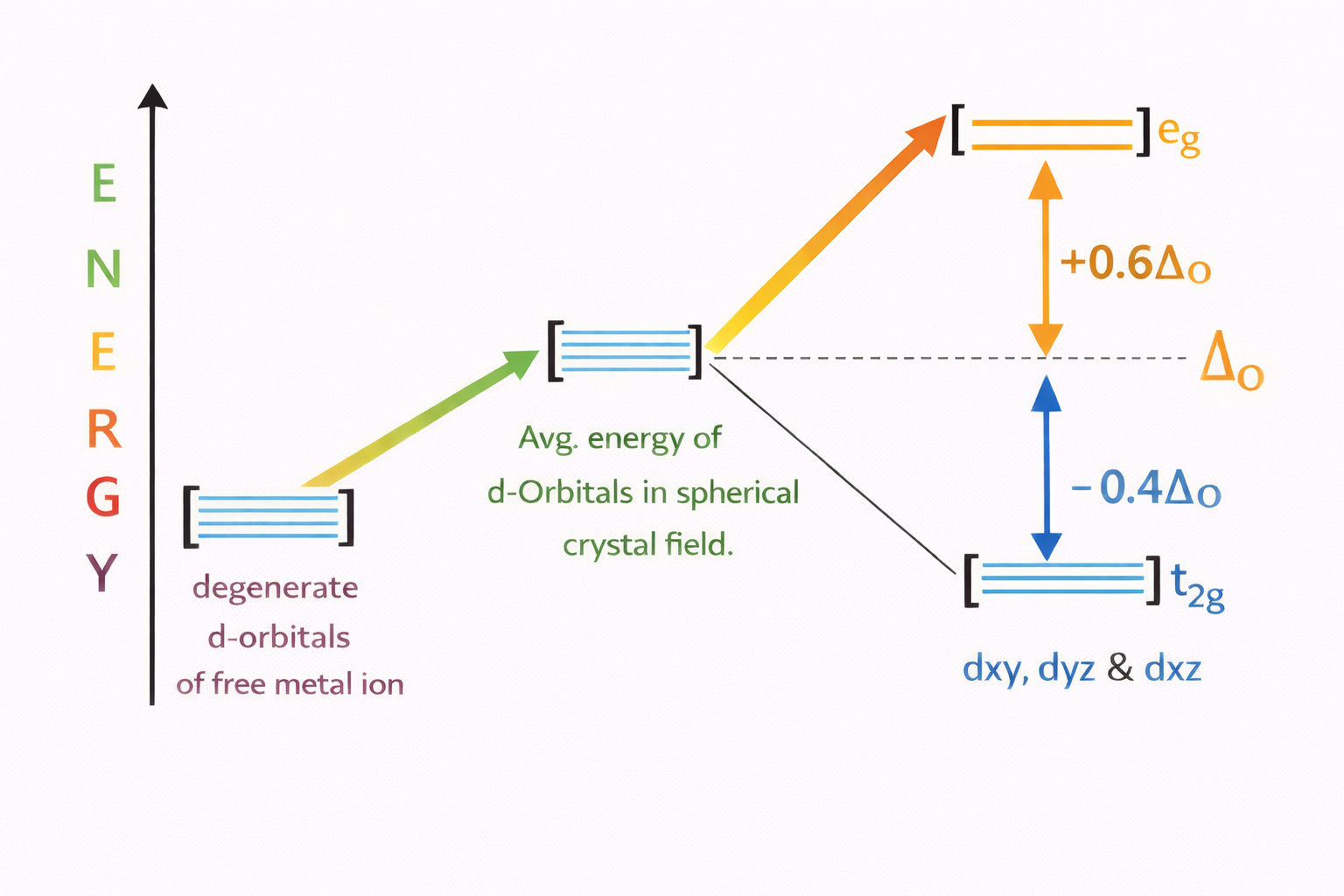
Crystal field splitting of d orbitals in an octahedral complex. The t2g orbitals are lower in energy and the eg orbitals are higher in energy relative to the barycenter.

In an octahedral complex, six ligands approach the metal ion along the x, y, and z axes. The d orbitals that point directly along these axes, namely d_{x}^{2}_{−y}^{2} and d_{z}^{2} experience greater repulsion from the ligands and became higher in energy. These two orbitals form the e_{g} set. In contrast, the three orbitals placed between the axes (d_{xy}, d_{xz} and d_{yz}) experience less repulsion and are lower in energy, forming the t_{2g} set. The energy difference between these two groups is called the crystal field splitting energy (Δo).

The magnitude of Δo depends on several factors, including the identity of the metal ion, its oxidation state, and the nature of the ligands. Strong-field ligands (such as CN⁻ or CO) produce a large splitting, while weak-field ligands (such as I⁻ or Br⁻) result in a smaller splitting.

Tetrahedral Complex

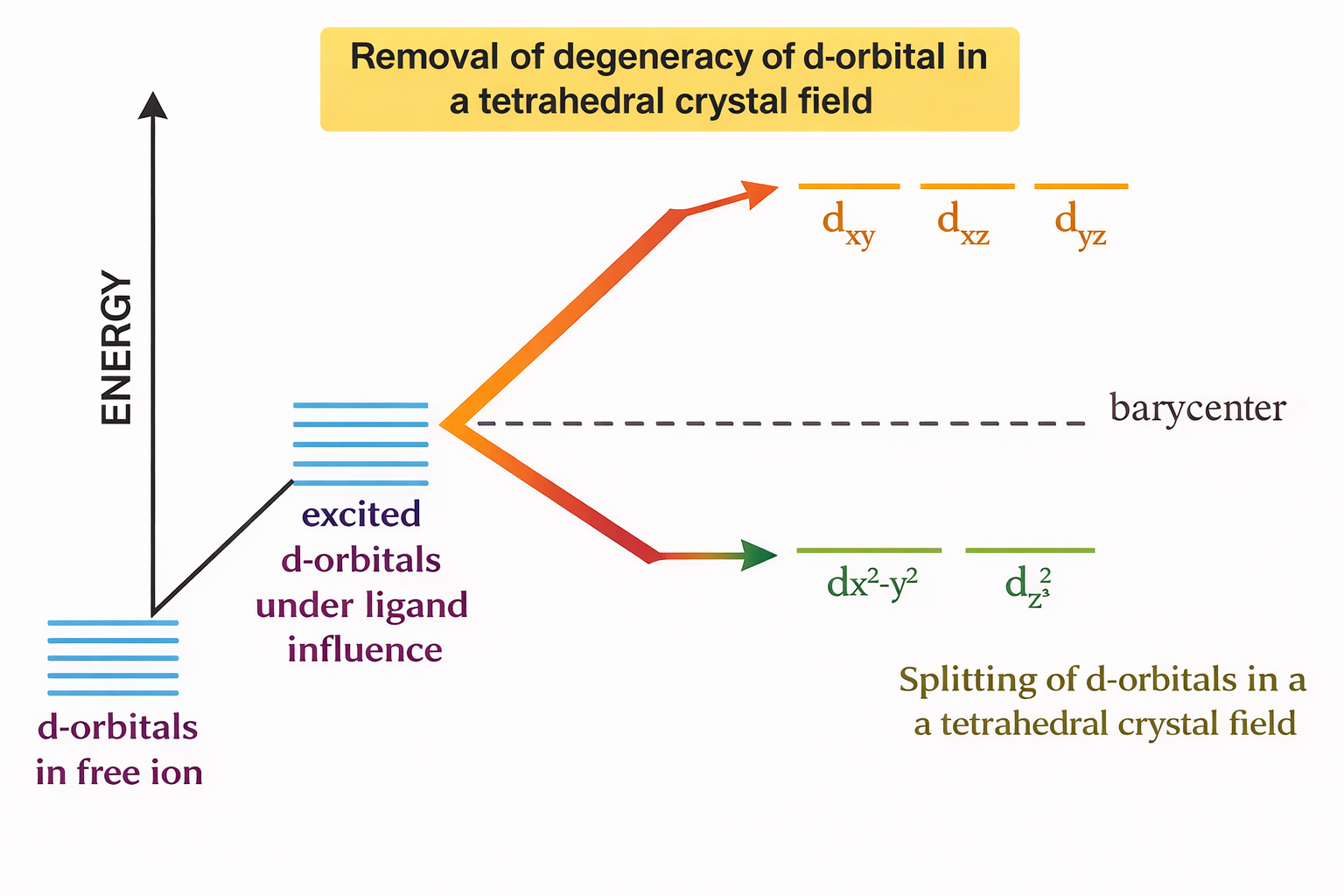
Crystal field splitting of d orbitals in an tetrahedral complex. The t2g orbitals are higher in energy and the e orbitals are higher in energy relative to the barycenter

In tetrahedral complexes, four ligands approach the metal ion between the coordinate axes rather than directly along them. As a result, the pattern of orbital splitting is reversed compared to the octahedral case. The orbitals d_{xy}, d_{xz} and d_{yz} now experience greater interaction with the ligands and are increased in energy forming t_{2} set, while d_{x}^{2}_{−y}^{2} and d_{z}^{2} are lower in energy forming the e_{g} set. Tetrahedral complexes lack a center of inversion (inversion center/symmetry). The labels g(gerade) and u (ungerade)refer to the parity of orbitals when inverted through a central point, which is only possible in centrosymmetric systems like octahedral complexes. The splitting energy in tetrahedral complexes is denoted as Δ_{t} and it is typically smaller than the octahedral splitting.

Δ_{t}= (4/9) Δo

Another important concept associated with crystal field splitting is the distinction between high-spin and low-spin configurations. When the splitting energy (Δ) is small (weak-field ligands), electrons occupy higher-energy orbitals before pairing, resulting in a high-spin configuration with more unpaired electrons. Conversely, when (Δ) is large (strong-field ligands), electrons occupy the lower-energy orbitals first, leading to a low-spin configuration with fewer unpaired electrons.

Crystal field splitting is an important phenomenon identifying the physical properties of coordination compounds. It explains their color, as electronic transitions between split d orbitals absorb visible light, and their magnetic properties, which depend on the number of unpaired electrons. Thus, crystal field theory provides a useful framework for understanding and predicting the behavior of transition metal complexes in chemistry.

== High and low spin and the spectrochemical series ==
The six bonding molecular orbitals that are formed are "filled" with the electrons from the ligands, and electrons from the d-orbitals of the metal ion occupy the non-bonding and, in some cases, anti-bonding MOs. The energy difference between the latter two types of MOs is called Δ_{O} (O stands for octahedral) and is determined by the nature of the π-interaction between the ligand orbitals with the d-orbitals on the central atom. As described above, π-donor ligands lead to a small Δ_{O} and are called weak- or low-field ligands, whereas π-acceptor ligands lead to a large value of Δ_{O} and are called strong- or high-field ligands. Ligands that are neither π-donor nor π-acceptor give a value of Δ_{O} somewhere in-between.

The size of Δ_{O} determines the electronic structure of the d^{4} - d^{7} ions. In complexes of metals with these d-electron configurations, the non-bonding and anti-bonding molecular orbitals can be filled in two ways: one in which as many electrons as possible are put in the non-bonding orbitals before filling the anti-bonding orbitals, and one in which as many unpaired electrons as possible are put in. The former case is called low-spin, while the latter is called high-spin. A small Δ_{O} can be overcome by the energetic gain from not pairing the electrons, leading to high-spin. When Δ_{O} is large, however, the spin-pairing energy becomes negligible by comparison and a low-spin state arises.

The spectrochemical series is an empirically derived list of ligands ordered by the size of the splitting Δ that they produce. It can be seen that the low-field ligands are all π-donors (such as I^{−}), the high field ligands are π-acceptors (such as CN^{−} and CO), and ligands such as H_{2}O and NH_{3}, which are neither, are in the middle.

I^{−} < Br^{−} < S^{2−} < SCN^{−} < Cl^{−} < NO_{3}^{−} < N_{3}^{−} < F^{−} < OH^{−} < C_{2}O_{4}^{2−} < H_{2}O < NCS^{−} < CH_{3}CN < py (pyridine) < NH_{3} < en (ethylenediamine) < bipy (2,2'-bipyridine) < phen (1,10-phenanthroline) < NO_{2}^{−} < PPh_{3} < CN^{−} < CO

== See also ==
- Crystal field theory
- Ligand dependent pathway
- Molecular orbital theory
- Nephelauxetic effect
