= Intrinsic bond orbitals =

Concept in chemistry

Intrinsic bond orbitals (IBO) are localized molecular orbitals giving exact and non-empirical representations of wave functions. They are obtained by unitary transformation and form an orthogonal set of orbitals localized on a minimal number of atoms. IBOs present an intuitive and unbiased interpretation of chemical bonding with naturally arising Lewis structures. For this reason IBOs have been successfully employed for the elucidation of molecular structures and electron flow along the intrinsic reaction coordinate (IRC). IBOs have also found application as Wannier functions in the study of solids.

== Theory ==
The IBO method entails molecular wave-functions calculated using self-consistent field (SCF) methods such as Kohn-Sham density functional theory (DFT) which are expressed as linear combinations of localized molecular orbitals.

In order to arrive at IBOs, intrinsic atomic orbitals (IAOs) are first calculated as representations of a molecular wave function for which each IAO can be assigned to a specific atom. This allows for a chemically intuitive orbital picture as opposed to the commonly used large and diffuse basis sets for the construction of more complex molecular wavefunctions.

IAOs are constructed from tabulated free-atom AOs of standard basis-sets under consideration of the molecular environment. This yields polarized atomic orbitals that resemble the free-atom AOs as much as possible, before orthonormalization of the polarized AOs results in the set of IAOs. IAOs are thus a minimal basis for a given molecule in which atomic contributions can be distinctly assigned. The sum of all IAOs spans exactly over the molecular orbitals which renders them an exact representation of the wavefunction. Since IAOs are associated with a specific atom, they can provide atom specific properties such as the partial charge. Compared to other charges, such as the Mulliken charge, the IAO charges are independent of the employed basis set.

IBOs are constructed as a linear combination over IAOs with the condition of minimizing the number of atoms over which the orbital charge is spread. Each IBO can thereby be divided into the contributions of the atoms as the electronic occupation $n_A(i')$ of orbital $i'$ on atom $A$. The localization is performed in the spirit of the Pipek-Mezey localization scheme, maximizing a localization functional $L$.

$$L = \sum_{i}^{occ}\sum_{A}^{atom}[n_A(i')]^p$$

with $p=4$ or $2$. While the choice of the exponent $p$ does not affect the resulting IBOs in most cases, the choice of $p=4$ localizes the orbitals in aromatic systems unlike $p=2$.

The process of IBO construction is performed by unitary tranfomation of canonical MOs, which ensures that the IBOs remain an exact and physically accurate representation of the molecular wavefunction due to the invariance of Slater determinant wavefunctions towards unitary rotations.

$$|i'\rangle = \sum_{i}^{occ} |i\rangle U_{ii'}$$

The unitary matrix $U_{ii'}$, which produces the localized IBOs upon matrix multiplication with set of occupied MOs $|i\rangle$, is thereby chosen to effectively minimize spread of IBOs over the atoms of a molecule. The product is a set of localized IBOs, closely resembling the chemically intuitive shapes of molecular orbitals, allowing for distinction of bond types, atomic contributions and polarization.

== Application in structure and bonding ==
In his original paper introducing IBOs, Knizia showed the versatility of his method for describing not only classical bonding situations, such as the σ and π bond, but also aromatic systems and non-trivial bonds. The differentiation of σ and π bonds in acrylic acid is possible based on IBO geometries, as are the identification of the IBOs corresponding to the oxygen lone pairs. Benzene provided an example of a delocalized aromatic system to test the IBO method. Apart from the C-C and C-H σ-bonds, the six electron π-system is expressed as three delocalized IBOs. Representation of non-Lewis bonding was demonstrated on diborane B_{2}H_{6}, with one IBO stretching over B-H-B, corresponding to the 3-center-2-electron bond.

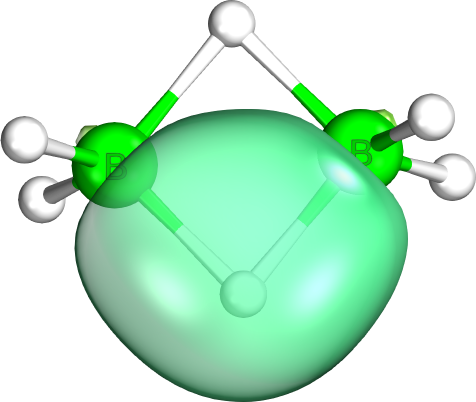
IBO of the 3-center-2-electron-bond in B_{2}H_{6} visualized using IBOView. Recreated from reference.

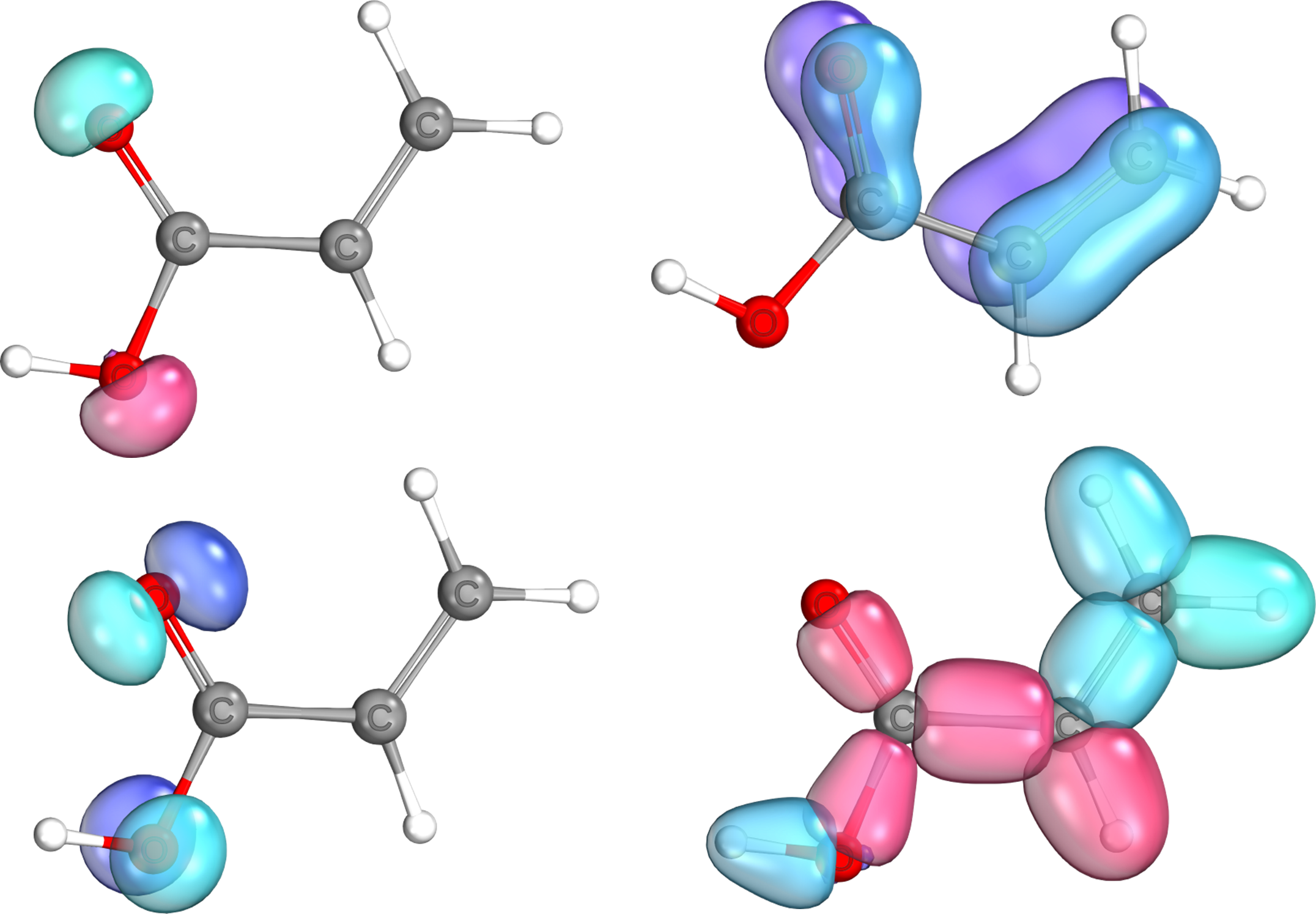
IBO of acrylic acid visualized using IBOview. Recreated from reference.

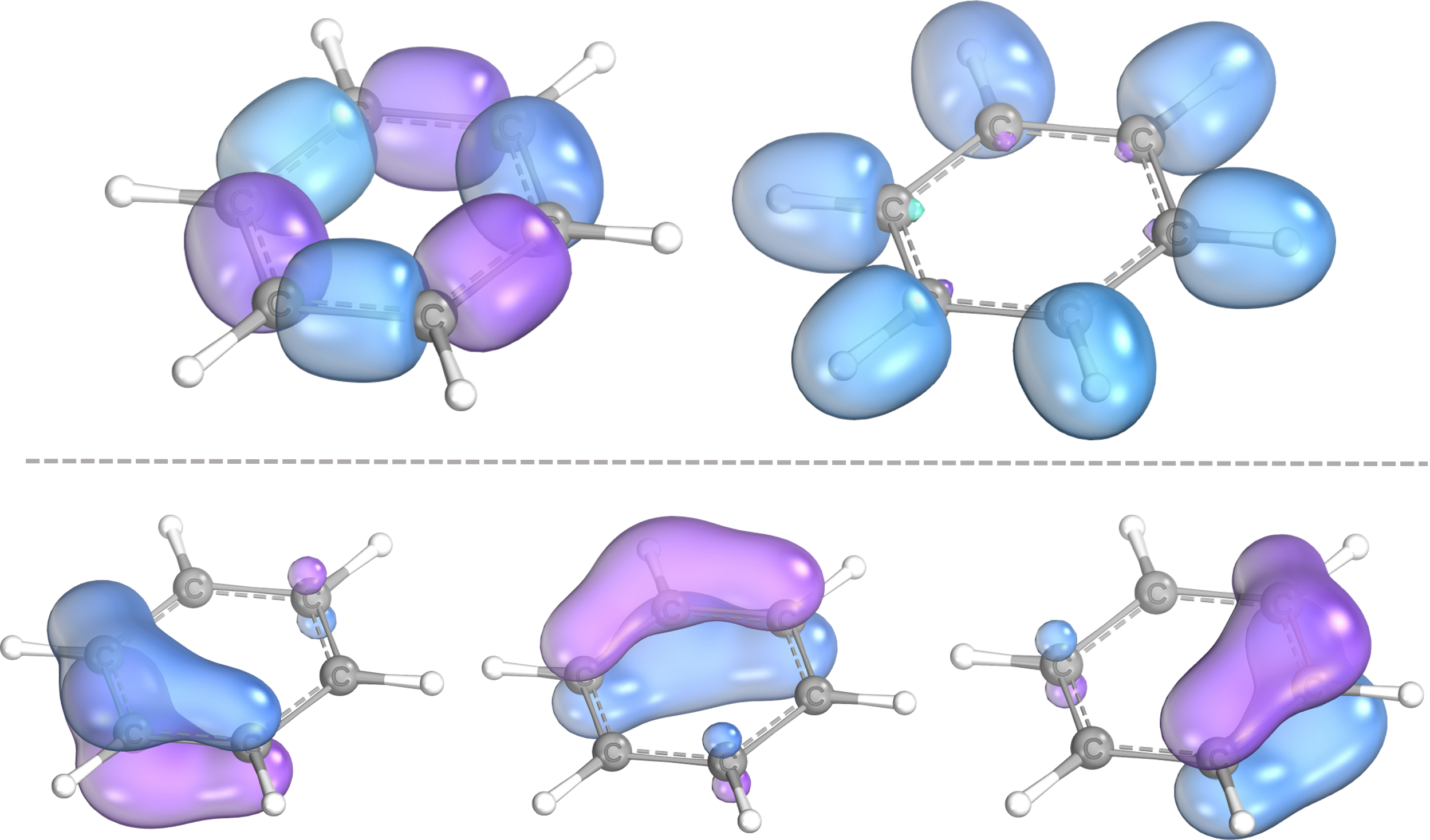
IBOs of benzene visualized using IBOview. Recreated from reference.

=== Transition metal compounds ===
IBO analysis was used to explain the stability of electron rich gold-carbene complexes, mimicking reactive intermediates in gold catalysis. While these complexes are sometimes depicted with a Au-C double bond, representing the sigma donation of the carbene and π backbonding of Au, IBO analysis points towards a minimal amount of π-backbonding with the respective orbital mainly localized on Au. The σ-donating carbene orbital is likewise strongly polarized towards C. Stabilization of the compound thus occurs through strong donation of the aromatic carbene substituents into the carbene carbon p-orbitals, outcompeting the Au-π-backdonation. IBO analysis was thus able to negate the double bond character of the gold-carbene complexes and provided deep insight into the electronic structure of Cy_{3}P-Au-C(4-OMe-C_{6}H_{4})_{2}) (Cy = cyclohexyl).

IBOs of Cy_{3}P-Au-C(4-OMe-C_{6}H_{4})_{2}), visualized using IBOview. Recreated from reference.

The π-backbonding character was again evaluated for gold-vinylidene complexes, as another common type of gold catalysis intermediates. IBO analysis revealed significantly stronger π-backbonding for the gold-vinylidenes compared to the gold-carbenes. This was attributed to the geometric inability of aromatic vinylidene substituents to compete with Au for π-interactions since the respective orbitals are perpendicular to each other.

Knizia and Klein similarly employed IBO for the analysis of [Fe(CO)_{3}NO]^{–}. The even polarization of IBOs between Fe and N points towards a covalently bonded NO ligand. The double bond occurs via two d-p π-interactions and results in a formal Fe^{0} center. Confirmed by further calculations, IBO proved as a fast and straightforward method to interpret bonding in this case. Making use of the low computational cost, a Cloke-Wilson rearrangement catalyzed by [Fe(CO)_{3}NO]^{–} was investigated by constructing the IBOs for every stationary point along the IRC. It was found that one of the Fe-NO π bonds takes active part in catalysis by electron transfer to and from the substrate, explaining the unique catalytic activity of [Fe(CO)_{3}NO]^{–} compared to the isoelectronic [Fe(CO)_{4}]^{2–}.

Apart from the above mentioned compounds, the IBO method has been employed to investigate various other transition metal complexes, such as gold-diarylallenylidenes or diplatinum diboranyl complexes, proving as a valuable tool to gain insight into the extent and nature of bonding.

=== Main group compounds ===
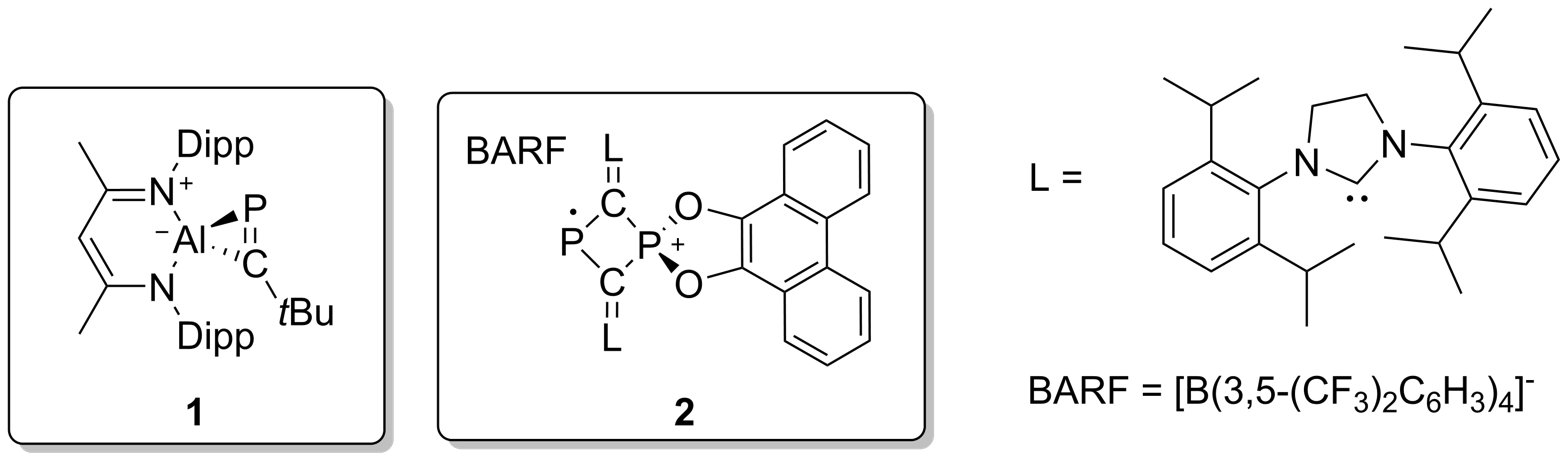
Structures of phosphaaluminirene (1) and distonic radical ion (2).

IBO analysis has been employed in main group chemistry to elucidate oftentimes non-trivial electronic structure. The bonding of phosphaaluminirenes was, for example, investigated showing a 3-center-2π-electron bond of the AlCP cycle. Further application was found for confirming the distonic nature of a phosphorus containing radical cation reported by Chen et al. (see figure). While the IAO charge analysis yielded a positive charge on the chelated P, IBOs showed the localization of the unpaired electron on the other P atom, confirming the spatial separation of radical site and charge.

Another example is the elucidation of the electronic structure of the hexamethylbenzene dication. Three π bonding IBOs were found between the basal C_{5}Me_{5} plane and the apical C, reminiscent of Cp* coordination complexes. The three π bonds are thereby polarized towards the apical C, which in turn coordinates to a CH_{3}^{+} cation with its lone pair. IBO analysis therefore revealed the Lewis-acidic and Lewis-basic character of the apical C.

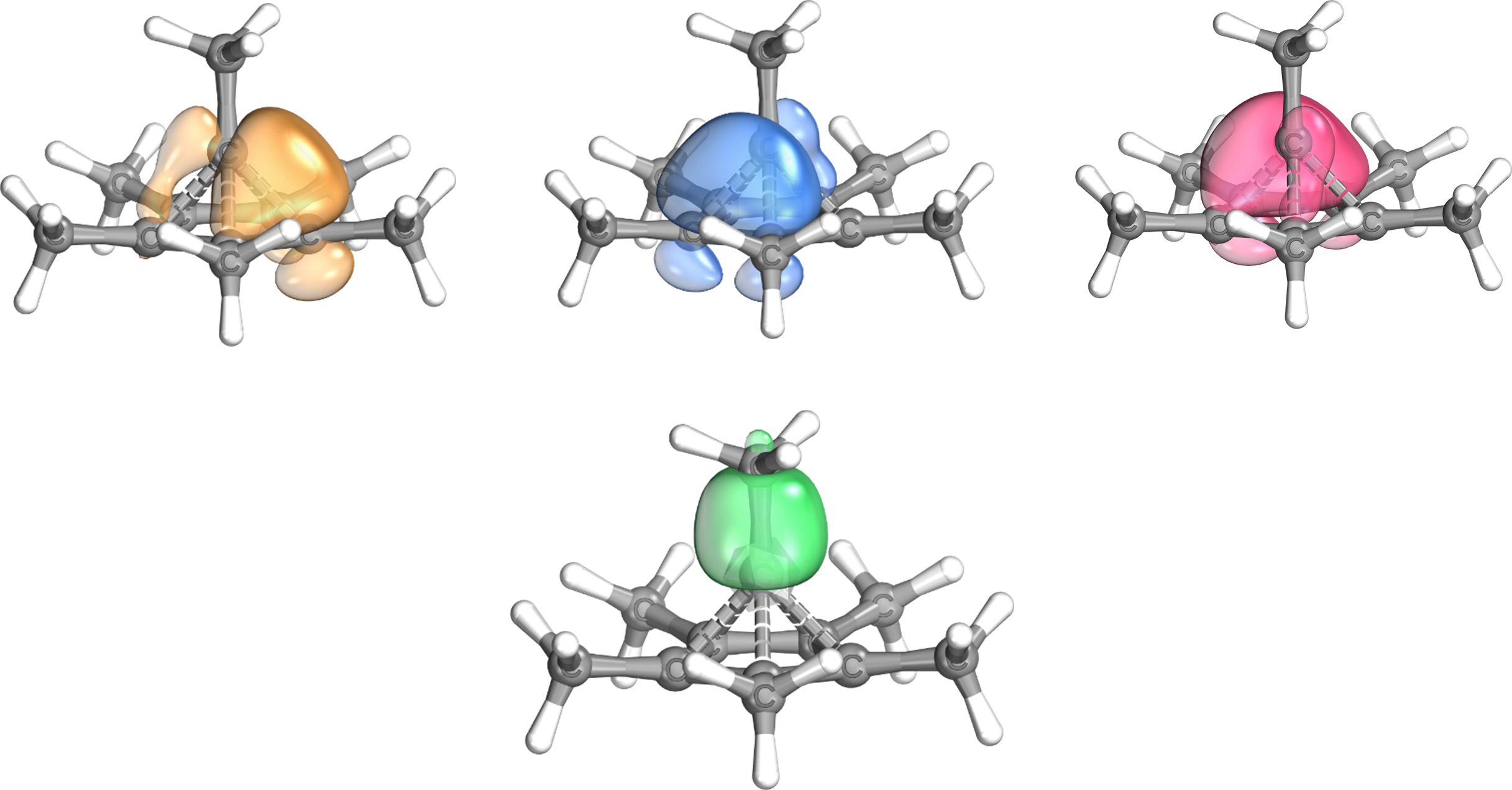
IBOs of the hexamethyl dication visualized using IBOview. Recreated from reference.

Applications of IBO for cluster compounds have included zirconium doped boron clusters. IBO analysis showed, that the unusual stability of the neutral ZrB_{12} cluster stems from several multicenter σ bonds. The B-B σ bonding orbitals extend to the central Zr atom, forming the mulicenter bonds. This example displays the method's aptitude to analyze cluster compounds and multicenter bonding.

=== Valence virtual intrinsic bond orbitals ===
Although IBOs typically describe occupied orbitals, the description of unoccupied orbitals can likewise be of value for interpreting chemical interactions. Valence virtual IBOs (vvIBOs) were introduced with the investigation of high valent formal Ni(IV) complexes. The bonding and antibonding manifold of the compound were described using IBOs and vvIBOs respectively. Compared to the widely used HOMO/LUMOs which are often spread over the whole molecule and can be difficult to interpret, vvIBOs allow for more direct interpretation of chemical interactions with unoccupied orbitals.

== Electron flow along the IRC ==
IBOs along the reaction coordinate of the SN_{2}-type self-exchange reaction of H_{3}CCl and Cl^{–}. Recreated from reference.

In 2015, Knizia and Klein introduced the analysis of electron flow in reactions with IBO as a non-empirical and straight-forward method of evaluating curly arrow mechanisms. Since IBOs are exact representations of Kohn-Sham wavefunctions, they can provide physical confirmation for curly arrows mechanisms based on first-principles. IBOs usually represent chemical bonds and lone pairs, this method allows for elucidation of bond rearrangements in terms of the elemental steps and their sequence. By calculating the root mean square deviations of the partial charge distributions compared to the initial charge distribution, IBOs taking active part in a reaction can be distinguished from those that remain unchanged along the IRC.

Knizia and Klein demonstrate the versatility of this method in their original report, first presenting a simple SN_{2}-type self-exchange reaction of H_{3}CCl and Cl^{–}, followed by the migration of π bonds in a substitution reaction (SN_{2}) and π- to σ-bond transformations in a Claisen rearrangement. Electron flow can be easily followed by observing the migration of an IBO and bond types are easily distinguished based on the geometries of the IBOs. The value of IBO analysis along the IRC especially shows for complex reactions, such as a cyclopropanation reaction with only one transition state and without intermediates, reported by Haven et al. Calculations by Knizia and Klein yielded a precise curly arrow mechanism for this reaction.

=== Closed-shell systems ===
Examples of IBO analysis along the IRC included the investigation of C-H bond activation by gold-vinylidene complexes. Through this method, it is possible to discern between concerted and stepwise reactions. The previously thought single step C-H activation reaction was in this case revealed to consist of three distinct phases: i) hydride transfer, ii) C-C bond formation and iii) sigma to pi rearrangement of the lone pair coordinated to Au.

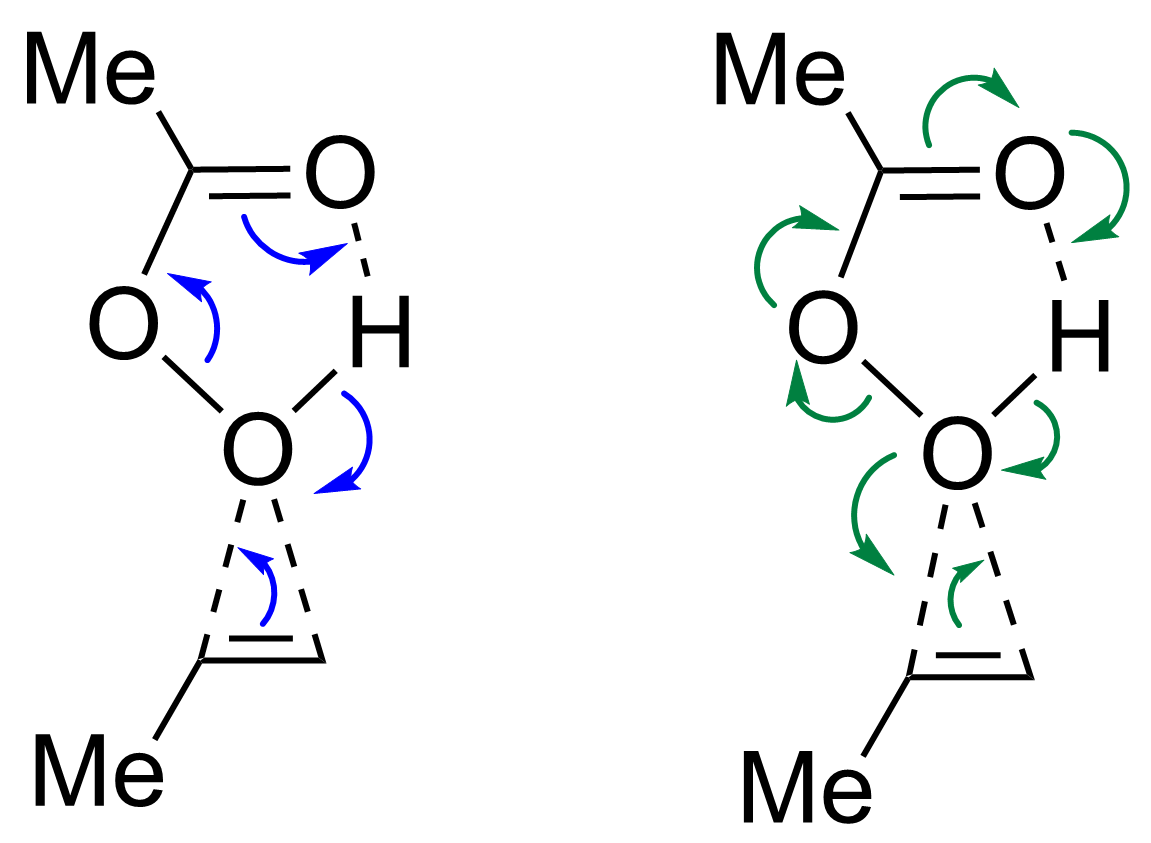
Comparison of four curly arrow textbook mechanism (left) and seven curly arrow IBO derived mechanism (right) of an epoxidation with a peracid.

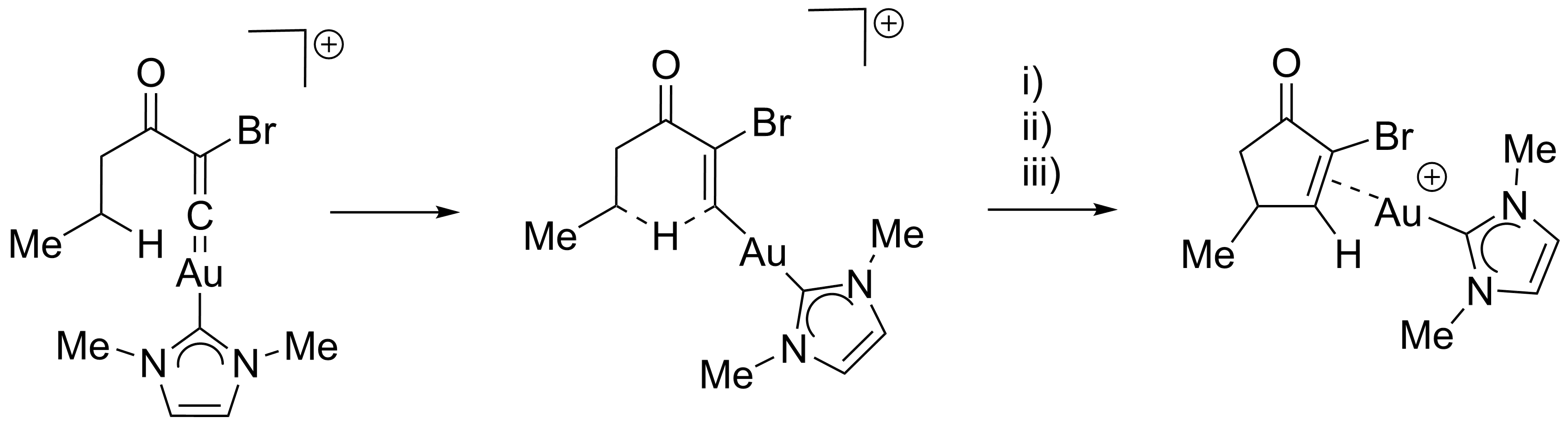
C-H activation by a gold-vinylidene complex. IBO enables distinction of three distinct phases: i) hydride transfer, ii) C-C bond formation and iii) sigma to pi rearrangement of the lone pair coordinated to Au.

Other reports of IBO analysis along the IRC include the elucidation and confirmation of a previously proposed mechanism for a [3,3]-sigmatropic rearrangement of a Au(I)-vinyl species or the epoxidation of alkene by peracids. For the latter, the textbook four curly arrow mechanism was found to be physically inaccurate. Instead, seven changing IBOs were found, yielding an ideal mechanism featuring seven curly arrows. The combination of IBO analysis with other computational methods, such as natural bond orbital (NBO) analysis for a Ti-catalyzed pyrrole synthesis or natural localized molecular orbital (NLMO) analysis for an intramolecular cycloaddition of a phosphaalkene to an arene has likewise led to insightful results regarding the specifics of the reaction mechanisms.

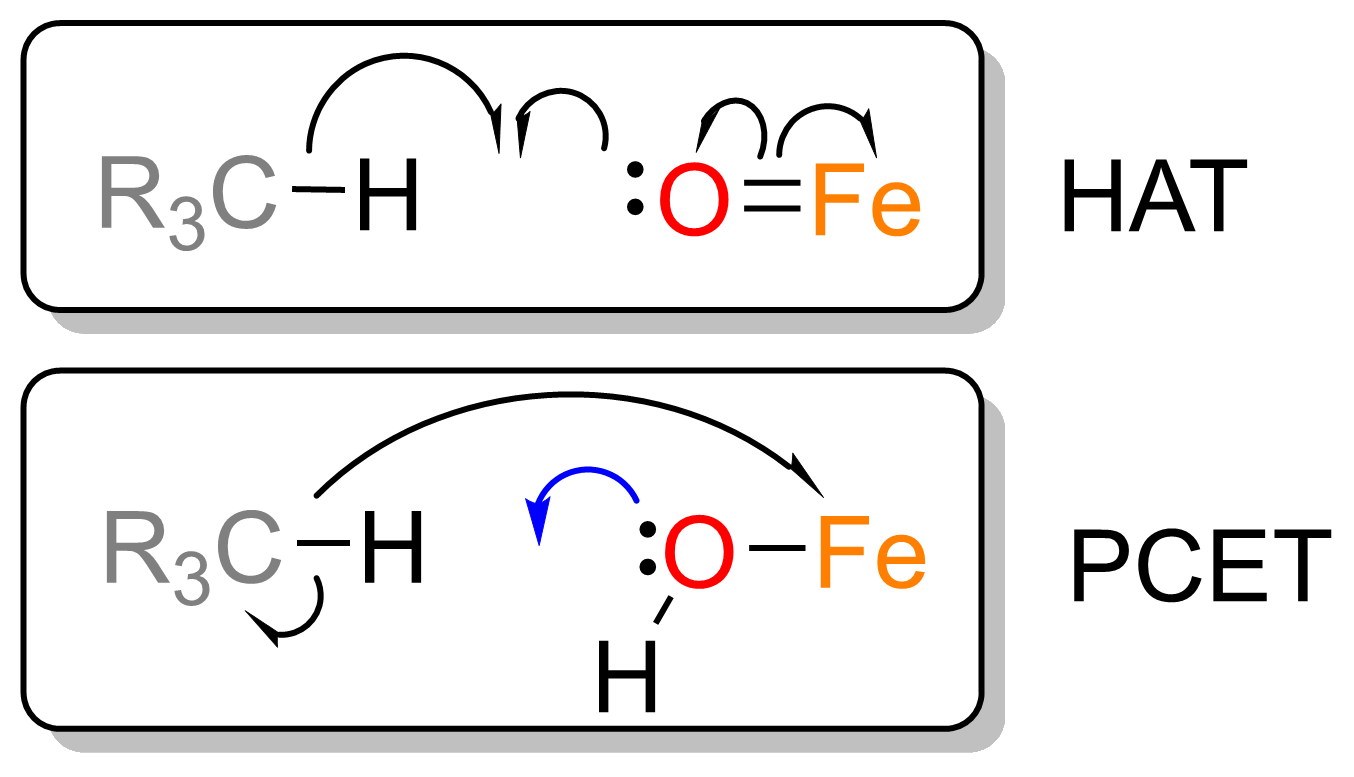
Schematic representation of hydrogen atom transfer (HAT) versus proton coupled electron transfer (PCET).

=== Open-shell systems ===
Klein and Knizia furthermore introduced the first examples of IBOs used for analysis of open-shell systems during proton-coupled electron transfer (PCET) and hydrogen atom transfer (HAT). The differentiation between pCET, a separate but concerted electron and proton transfer, and HAT, the transfer of a hydrogen atom, were shown for two well-studied model systems of enzymatic Fe-oxo active sites. IBOs along the IRC were calculated for the alpha and beta spin manifold respectively. While the IBO of the alpha spin electron travelled together with the proton to take part in the formation of a new H-O bond in case of HAT, the electron was transferred to the Fe-center separated from the transferred proton for PCET. The successful application of the IBO method for these two examples of open-shell systems was suggested to pave the way for broader applications to similar problems.

== See also ==
- Localized molecular orbitals
