= Sigma non-innocence =

Sigma non-innocence is a special form of non-innocence, an oxidation characteristic in metal complexes. It is mainly discussed in coordination complexes of late transition metals in their high formal oxidation states. Complexes exhibiting sigma non-innocence differ from classical Werner coordination complexes in that their bonding and antibonding orbitals have an inverted distribution of metal and ligand character (cf. inverted ligand field). The oxidation of the ligand and a lowered charge at the metal center renders the assignment of the oxidation state non-trivial.

== Sigma non-innocence in copper complexes ==
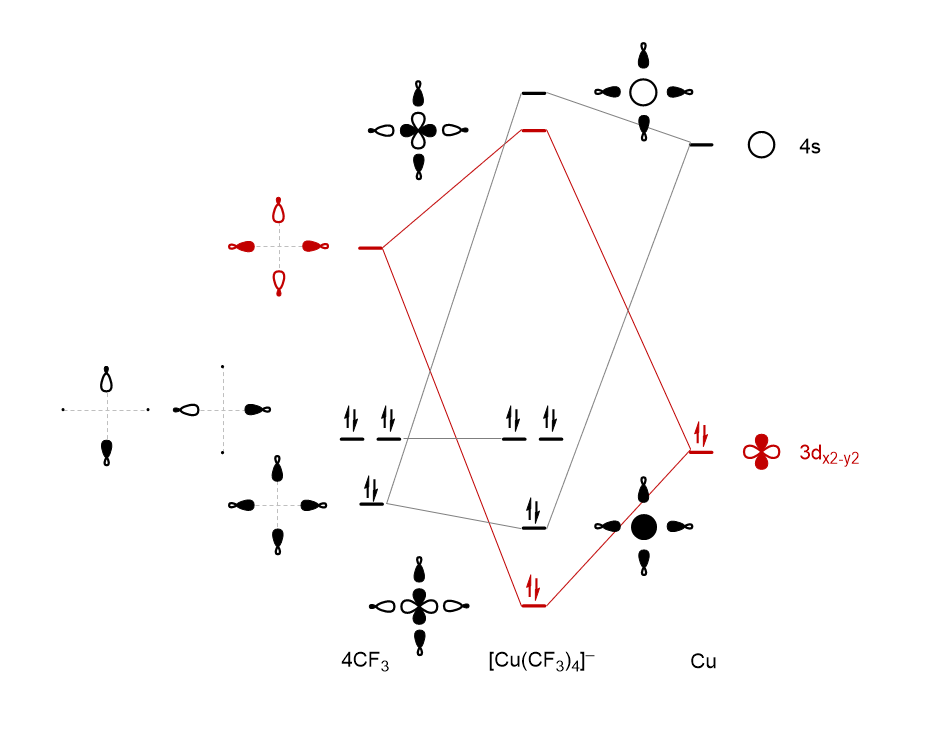
Snyder's molecular orbital diagram for [Cu(CF_{3})_{4}]^{–}.

Sigma non-innocence has been extensively discussed for the prototypical example of a copper complex [Cu(CF_{3})_{4}]^{−} in conjunction with the concept of an inverted ligand field. In 1995, Snyder suggested, based on his quantum chemical calculations, that this formal Cu(III) (d^{8}) complex would be more appropriately represented as a Cu(I) (d^{10}) complex. Snyder pointed out that the frontier molecular orbitals of [Cu(CF_{3})_{4}]^{−} are dominated by ligand parentage due to the higher-lying ligand orbitals compared to the metal orbitals, and this inversion of the ligand field causes the d_{x2‑y2} orbital to be occupied and the lowest unoccupied molecular orbital (LUMO) to be ligand centered.

Later, Lancaster et al. experimentally validated this inverted ligand field electronic structure of [Cu(CF_{3})_{4}]^{−} using core spectroscopy techniques. Their findings revealed that the 3d orbitals are nearly fully occupied, supporting the formulation of this ion as a Cu(I) species. The assignment of what would be typically called a Cu(III) species as Cu(I) indicates the sigma non-innocence of the perfluoromethyl ligands in the complex.

The researchers also examined the electronic structure of other formally Cu(III) complexes using Cu L_{2,3}-edge X-ray absorption spectroscopy together with computational techniques. They reported that all the Cu(III) species they studied except CuF_{6}^{3–} have significantly diminished metal d-character in their LUMOs compared to the formal d^{8} assignment. This implies that ligand field inversion and sigma non-innocence are not unique to [Cu(CF_{3})_{4}]^{−} but is general in many systems.

== Sigma non-innocence in nickel complexes ==
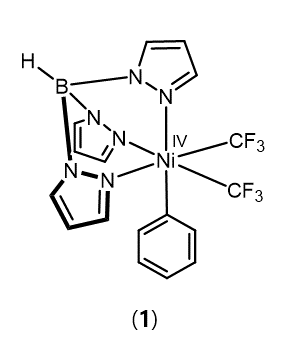
Ni(IV) complex "1" reported by Sanford et al

Klein et al. computationally analyzed the electronic structure of a high valent Nickel complex "1". This complex was previously reported to readily undergo aryl-CF_{3} bond-forming reductive elimination.

Klein et al. reported that this formally Ni(IV) complex is best described as Ni approaching the +II oxidation state. They used intrinsic bond orbital method to analyze the bonding of the complex and identified that the bond between C_{Ar} and Ni is polarized to Ni with the partial charge on Ni (0.988) larger than the one on C_{Ar} (0.973). They attributed the +II oxidation state of Ni to the oxidation of the aryl ligand due to sigma non-innocence.

Based on calculations, they also asserted that the formal reductive elimination from this complex is essentially redox neutral, with the Ni center retaining its Ni(II) state throughout the C-C bond-forming event. They interpreted the bond-formation mechanism as the nucleophilic CF_{3} group attacking the electrophilic aryl group.
