= Hydrogen-bridged cations =

Charged species in chemistry

Hydrogen-bridged cations are a type of charged species in which a hydrogen atom is simultaneously bonded to two atoms through partial sigma bonds. While best observable in the presence of superacids at room temperature, spectroscopic evidence has suggested that hydrogen-bridged cations exist in ordinary solvents. These ions have been the subject of debate as they constitute a type of charged species of uncertain electronic structure.

== Theory ==
Two models provide an explanation of their structure, the classical and the non-classical view. The classical view (Figure 1.a) involves a fast-equilibrating system in which a hydrogen atom rapidly shifts between two adjacent carbon atoms. In this model, fast equilibrium results from a low energy barrier between the two conformations of the molecule, and each conformer has a localized positive charge. The potential energy diagram of this model is characterized by a double-well with two energy minima.

The non-classical view (Figure 1.b) involves the delocalization of two electrons over three atoms (1 hydrogen and 2 carbon atoms). The model is characterized by a 3-membered ring where a hydrogen atom is located between two other atoms with partial sigma bonds. The potential energy diagram of this model is characterized by a single energy minimum, where the structure of the cation corresponds to the transition state between the two conformers of the classical view.

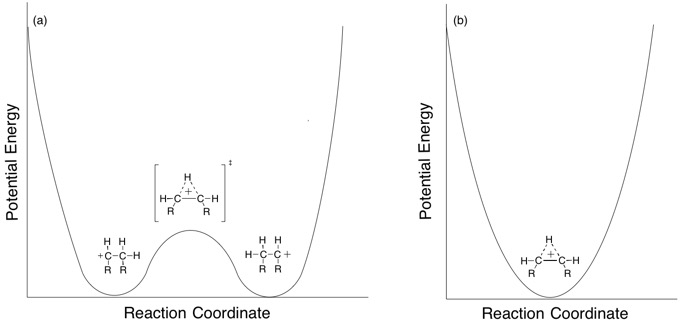

Figure 1 - Potential Energy Surface (PES) of (a) classical and (b) non-classical view of a hydrogen-bridged cation.

== History ==
For several decades after they were first proposed around 1950, the existence and importance of non-classical ions in organic chemistry was bitterly controversial. As hydrogen bridges discussed here are 3 center (3 atom) - 2 electron bonds, the investigations over the possibilities of such systems laid an important framework from which to understand this bonding. Many of these studies centered around the 2-norbornyl cation. Observations made by Saul Winstein and others suggested that highly delocalized and symmetric intermediates were present in the reactions of various substituted norbornyl cations, evidence for non-classical ions. H. C. Brown, the most outspoken opponent of non-classical ions, believed that such non-classical bonding was invoked far too widely and saw no reason to deviate from the classical idea of rapidly equilibrating, discrete carbocations. In 1973, G. Olah was able to directly observe the 2-norbornyl cation by low-temperature NMR and confirm the presence of a non-classical 2-norbornyl cation, allowing the field to reach some conclusions about the possibilities of 3 center - 2 electron bonds involving carbon. This verification of delocalized sigma bonding in the 2-norbornyl system was a critical foundation for understanding hydrogen bridges between carbon atoms, another form of delocalized sigma bonding.

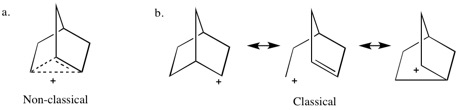

Scheme 1 - The classical and non-classical models for bonding in the 2-norbornyl cation are shown above. The non-classical model (a) shows one three-center two-electron bond with a delocalized positive charge. The classical model, (b) describes a rapid equilibration between three distinct carbocations rather than delocalization.

== Structure ==
Two different types of C-H-C bonding are recognized. The first is an "open" type, entailing linear geometry and negligible bonding between the terminal carbon atoms, while the second is the "closed" type, with triangular geometry allowing bonding interaction between terminal carbons. The relationship between these two types of 3-center 2-electron bonding can be shown through a molecular orbital diagram. Because of the additional overlap between the orbitals, the bonding orbital for the "closed" type is pushed lower in energy relative to the "open" type. The presence of two electrons in this system implies that the closed geometry will be energetically favorable, which has been seen in studies of metal-H-metal systems.

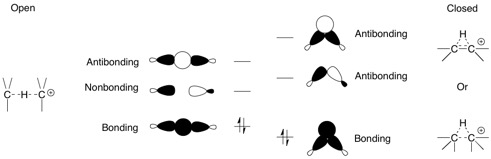

Figure 2 - A molecular orbital diagram for open and closed hydrogen bridged cations with carbon is shown above. The open and closed structures show different orbital overlap which leads to different bonding energy.

=== Closed C-H-C Bonds ===
In closed 3 center 2 electron bonds, the atoms are arranged in a triangular shape to increase orbital overlap as shown above. Because there are only two electrons in the system, this overlap causes a net reduction in energy relative to the open, linear bond. While the closed C-H-C bond has not been isolated or studied, it is well established that hydrogen-bridged metals prefer the closed triangular bonding pattern. One example of closed C-H-C bonding is seen in the detection of "protonated ethene" through mass spectrometry, C_{2}C^{+}_{7}, with the bridging hydrogen sitting atop the π-bond of ethene. These closed bridges are likely short-lived intermediates, as there is no steric hindrance to prevent further reaction.

=== Open C-H-C bonds ===
While supposedly less favored energetically, the steric properties of some molecules promote the formation of open C-H-C bridges, as shown below in Scheme 2. In 1978 T.S. Sorenson obtained NMR evidence for hydrido-bridged carbocations with 3-center 2-electron bonds through using the 1,6-dimethyl-1-cyclodecyl cation. The steric restriction of the ten-membered ring allowed the formation of a bridging hydrogen species. Expanding upon this approach, in 1992 McMurry developed the in-bicyclo[4,4,4]-1-tetradecyl cation, where the additional ring vastly improved the stability of the molecule by maintain a more rigid structure around the hydrogen bridge.

== Synthesis ==
While they are reactive intermediates, hydrogen bridged cations can be stabilized sterically. Hydrogen bridged cations are generally formed by producing a carbocation through the addition of a proton to an alcohol or alkene. Instead of continuing the reaction through the nucleophile addition of the conjugate base to the carbocation, a neighboring C-H bond can interact with the carbocation to form the hydrogen bridge. In Sorensen's 1978 synthesis and observation of the 1,6-dimethyl-1-cyclododecyl anion, the hydroxyl group of 1,6-dimethyl-1-cyclodecanol was removed using fluorosulfonic acid. This allowed the formation of the 1,6 hydrogen bridge. With McMurry's in-bicyclo[4.4.4]-tetradecyl cation, the alkene across from the methyne hydrogen was protonated by trifluoroacetic acid (TFA) to allow a bridge to the tertiary carbocation bridgehead.

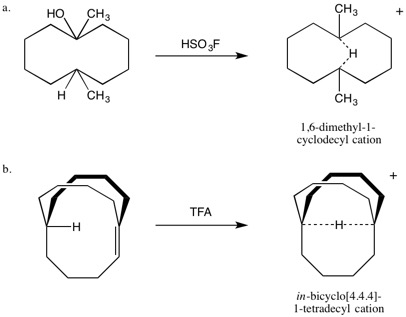

Scheme 2 - Final steps in the synthesis of (a) 1,6-dimethyl-1-cyclodecyl cation, first characterized by T.S. Sorensen in 1978 and (b) the in-bicyclo[4.4.4]-1-tetradecyl cation which J. E. McMurry synthesized in 1992. Both involve the use of a strong acid to form a linear 3 center-2 electron bond.

In both cases, the final step used an extremely strong acid to form a carbocation across the molecule from the hydrogen to be bridged. In Sorensen's use of fluorosulfonic acid, a hydroxyl group leaves to form a tertiary carbocation. With TFA, an alkene is protonated, again causing the creation of the carbocation bridgehead. However, the stability of McMurry's in-bycyclo[4.4.4]-tetradecyl cation allows the alkene to be protonated with much weaker acids as well. Even in pure acetic acid, the alkene is protonated to about 50% as determined with NMR.

Hydrogen-bridged cations have been implicated in the transannular migration of hydrogens. It has been noticed that the transannular rearrangement in the reaction between an acid and a cycloalkene always results in cis addition of the nucleophile. Presumably, the stereoselectivity of this type of reaction comes from a nucleophilic attack on a hydrogen-bridged cation (Scheme 1). In this model, the electron cloud of the hydrogen bridge prevents the nucleophile from having accessibility to that side of the molecule, thus forcing it to attack from a cis orientation with respect to the initial proton.

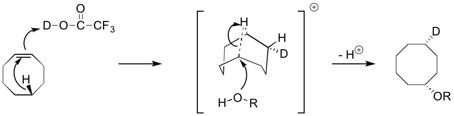

Scheme 3 -Transannular migration of a hydrogen and cis nucleophilic attack.

== Characterization ==
=== Nuclear magnetic resonance (NMR) spectroscopy ===
The most significant trait of bridging hydrogens in NMR spectra is their upfield shift. Due to the increased number of bonds that the hydrogen atom is part of, the higher electron density around hydrogen shields the ^{1}H nucleus, causing its chemical shift to appear at negative ppm. Characterization of the dimethylcyclodecyl ion by Sorensen in 1978 relied on low-temperature NMR, as the ion slowly decomposes at above -70 °C, and showed the bridging hydrogen at δ -3.9. McMurry's characterization of the more stable in-bicyclo[4,4,4]-tetradecyl cation showed two broad 12 proton peaks at δ 2.5 and 1.9, and a broad proton singlet at δ -3.46. Depending on the length of bridging chains in a similar bridged bicyclo[3,3,1]-nonyl cations the upfield shift of the bridging hydrogen can vary from δ -6.50 to 0.07. This is actually due to a change in C-H-C bond angle, where change in bond angle affects the bonding nature of the 3 center-2 electron bond.

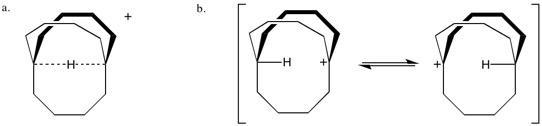

Scheme 4 - The classical and non-classical bonding of the in-bicyclo[4.4.4]-1-tetradecyl cation are shown above. The non-classical model (a) shows one hydrogen bridged molecule while the classical model (b) would imply rapid interconversion between two distinct carbocations and lack the hydrogen bridge. McMurry confirmed the presence of the 3-center 2-electron bond and the hydrogen bridged species by NMR.

=== Infrared (IR) spectroscopy ===
An asymmetric C-H-C stretching band at 2213 cm^{−1} was observed in McMurry's synthesis. This was assigned through observation of a 1558 cm^{−1} replacing the 2113 cm^{−1} band upon substitution of the in-hydrogen with in-deuterium. Because the isotropic shift was observed while all other peaks remained constant, the two peaks were able to be assigned to the bridging hydrogen or deuterium. The energy of 2133 cm^{−1} for the C-H-C stretching is lower than typical for C-H bonds as a result of adding a third body to the oscillating system.

== Hydrogen-bridged radical cation catalysis ==
Hydrogen-Bridged cations have been implicated in the catalysis of isomerization of radical species. This mechanism involves the transformation of a radical ion into its lower-energy hydrogen-shifted isomer using a neutral molecule as the catalyst. The need for a catalyst is the result of a large energy barrier that prevents spontaneous interconversion of the protonated species. While 1,2-alkyl shifts. of radical species are fully allowed processes and do not involve the formation of a hydrogen-bridged cation intermediate, these intermediates have been proposed to provide a feasible low-energy pathway for forbidden 1,3-alkyl shifts.

=== Proton-transfer catalysis ===
The term Proton-Transfer Catalysis (PTC) was first introduced by Diethard K. Bhome in 1992. In this process, a neutral molecule transports a proton from a high- to a low-energy site of a protonated radical to catalyze its isomerization. The first confirmed example of PTC was the isomerization of the methylene oxonium ion.

The two species involved in this mechanism are the more stable distonic methylene oxonium ion (^{•}CH_{2}OH_{2}^{+}) and the less stable ionized methanol (CH_{3}OH^{+•}) species. These two species are separated by a large (108.4 kJ/mol) energy barrier that prevents their spontaneous interconversion. However, it was observed that when ionized methanol interacts with water in the chemical ionization source of a mass spectrometer, it readily transforms into the more stable distonic ion.

A hydrogen-bridged cation was proposed to be responsible for this isomerization (Scheme 5). In 1996, Gauld modeled the potential energy surfaces of this reaction using water as a spectator molecule and as a mode of proton transport. This study determined that a transition state in the mechanism of water as a spectator ion (no hydrogen bridge) posed an energy barrier of 115 kJ/mol (higher than that for spontaneous isomerization). Water-mediated isomerization was modeled with a 3- and a 5-membered transition state hydrogen-bridged cation. These models only posed energy barriers of 12.3 and 8.5 kJ/mol, respectively (Scheme 6). Since a spectator-water model resulted in a higher energy barrier, it was established that the PTC mechanism proposed by Audier and Mourgues with hydrogen-bridged cations is energetically plausible, thus supporting the existence of a hydrogen bridge.

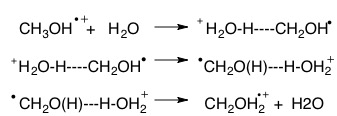

Scheme 5 -Proposed reaction mechanism for the isomerization of ionized methanol to the methylene oxonium ion.

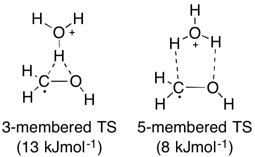

Scheme 6 - 3-membered and 5-membered transition states for the isomerization of ionized methanol to the methylene oxonium ion.

The requirements for the neutral molecule catalyst is that it must be basic enough to deprotonate one site of the ionic species, but sufficiently weak to donate the proton to a different atom on the substrate ion. This is best exemplified by considering the proton affinity of the neutral molecule. For example, the PA value of water is 690 kJ/mol, which is found between the PA of the carbon (670 kJ/mol) and that of the oxygen (699 kJ/mol) in CH_{2}OH^{•}. In this example, the water molecule is basic enough to deprotonate the carbon atom, and acidic enough to donate the proton back but to the oxygen atom, thus facilitating the isomerization of the original species.
