= Paul G. Mezey =

Paul G. Mezey is a Hungarian-Canadian mathematical chemist. He was the Canada Research Chair in Scientific Modeling and Simulation in the Department of Chemistry at the Memorial University of Newfoundland. He retired from Memorial University in 2018.

He is known for the Pipek–Mezey localization scheme.

== Biography ==
Mezey earned a Master's degrees in chemistry, a Ph.D. in Chemistry, and a Master's degree in mathematics, all from Eötvös Loránd University in Budapest, in the years 1967, 1970, and 1972 respectively. From 1982 to 2003, he was a professor of chemistry and mathematics at the University of Saskatchewan, where he earned a D. Sc. in 1985 in mathematical chemistry. He was a faculty member at Memorial University from 2003 to 2018.

Mezey is editor in chief of the Journal of Mathematical Chemistry.

== Awards and honors ==
In 2003, Mezey received a Canada Research Chair; the chair was renewed for a second term 2010 and concluded in 2017. Mezey is a foreign member of the Hungarian Academy of Sciences.

== See also ==
- Localized molecular orbitals
