= Inverted ligand field theory =

Molecular orbital theory

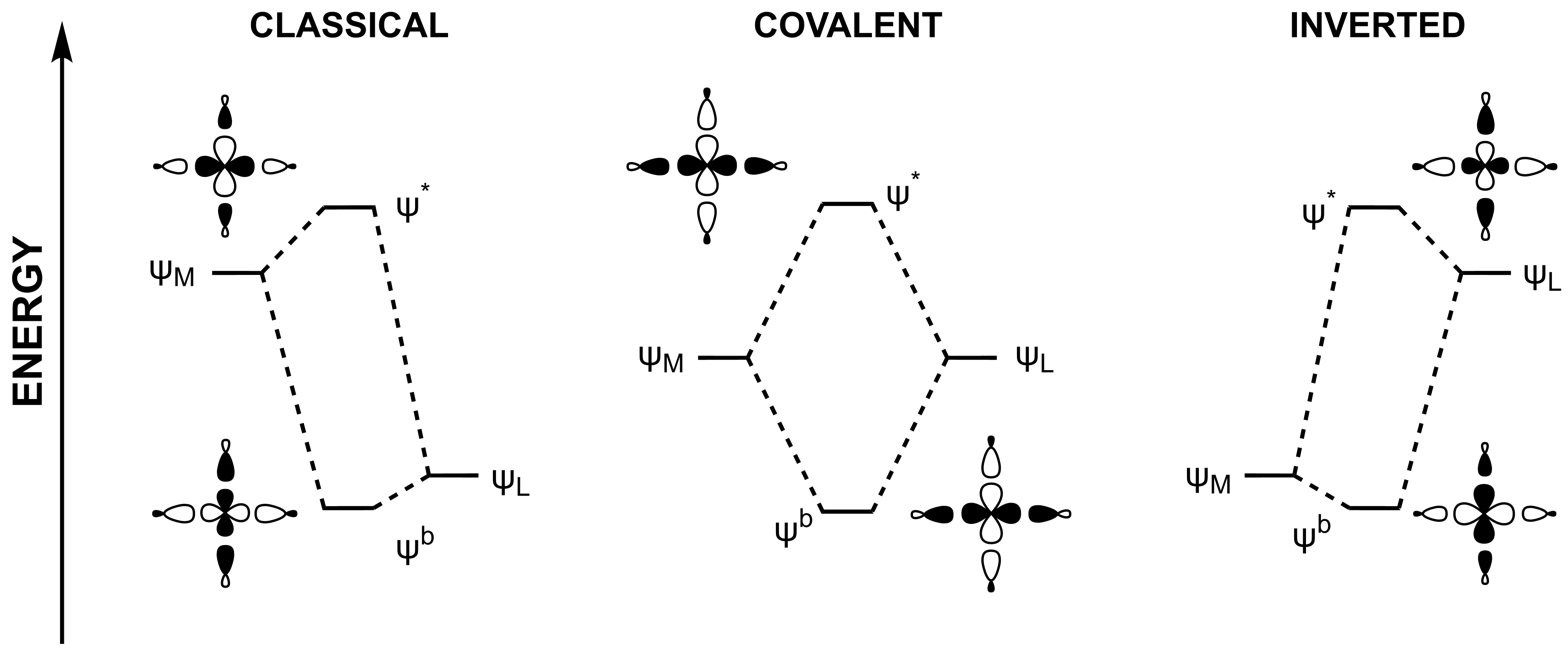
Ligand field molecular orbital (MO) bonding regimes for Werner-type (left), covalent (middle), and inverted ligand fields.

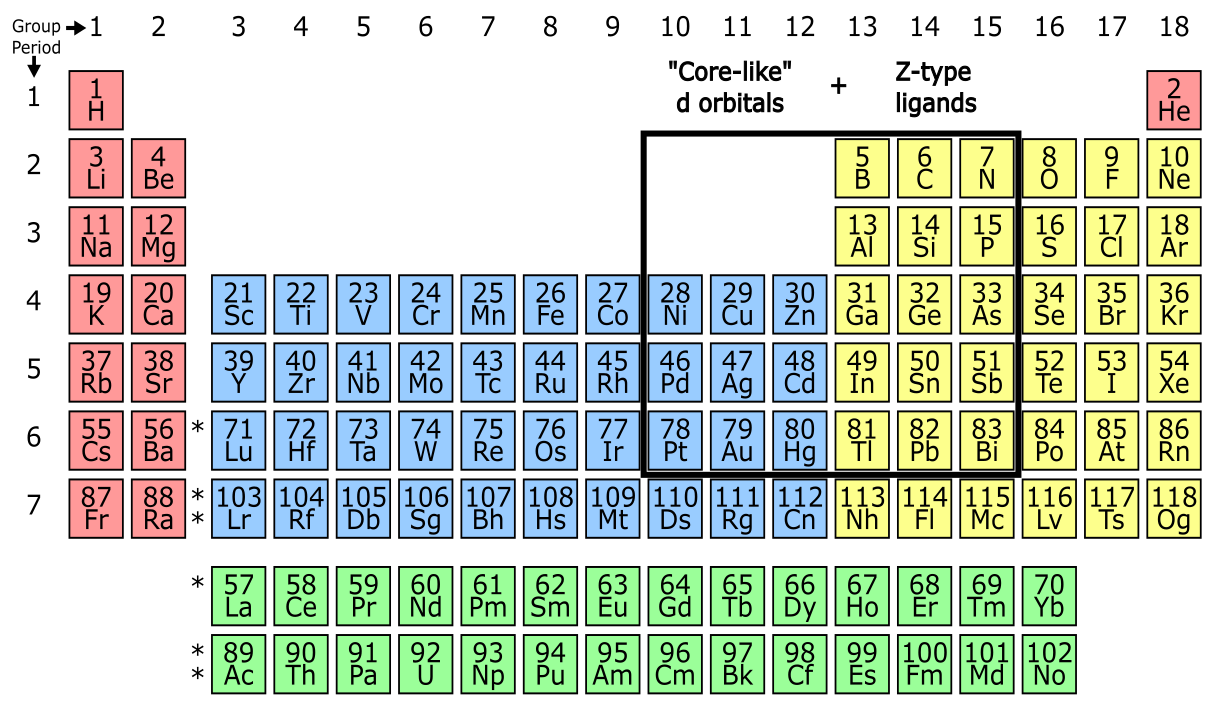
At the transition-metal - main group boundary, metal cations in organometallic complexes are more electronegative than the relatively more electropositive ligand atoms which act as z-type ligands.

Inverted ligand field theory (ILFT) describes a phenomenon in the bonding of coordination complexes where the lowest unoccupied molecular orbital is primarily of ligand character. This is contrary to the traditional ligand field theory or crystal field theory picture and arises from the breaking down of the assumption that in organometallic complexes, ligands are more electronegative and have frontier orbitals below those of the d orbitals of electropositive metals. Towards the right of the d-block, when approaching the transition-metal–main group boundary, the d orbitals become more core-like, making their cations more electronegative. This decreases their energies and eventually arrives at a point where they are lower in energy than the ligand frontier orbitals. Here the ligand field inverts so that the bonding orbitals are more metal-based, and antibonding orbitals more ligand-based. The relative arrangement of the d orbitals are also inverted in complexes displaying this inverted ligand field.

== History ==
Cu(CF_{3})_{4}^{−} square planar structure

The first example of an inverted ligand field was demonstrated in paper form 1995 by James Snyder. In this theoretical paper, Snyder proposed that the [Cu(CF_{3})_{4}]^{−} complexes reported by Naumann et al. and assigned a formal oxidation state of +3 at the copper would be better thought of as Cu(I). By comparing the d-orbital occupation, calculated charges and orbital population of [Cu(CF_{3})_{4}]^{−} "Cu(III)" complex and the formally Cu(I) [Cu(CH_{3})_{2}]^{−} complex, they illustrated how the former could be better described as a d10 copper complex experiencing two electron donation from the CF^{−}_{3} ligands. The phenomenon, termed an inverted ligand field by Roald Hoffman, began to be described by Aullón and Alvarez as they identified this phenomenon as being a result of relative electronegativities. Lancaster and co-workers later provided experimental evidence to support the assignment of this oxidation state. Using UV/visible/near IR spectroscopy, Cu K-edge X-ray absorption spectroscopy, and 1s2p resonant inelastic X-ray scattering in concert with density functional theory, multiplet theory, and multireference calculations, they were able to map the ground state electronic configuration. This showed that the lowest unoccupied orbital was of primarily trifluoromethyl character. This confirmed the presence of an inverted ligand field and started building experimental tools to probe this phenomenon. Since the Snyder case, many other complexes of later transition metals have been shown to display inverted ligand field through both theoretical and experimental methods.

== Probing inverted ligand fields ==
Computational and experimental techniques have been imperative for the study of inverted ligand fields, especially when used in cooperatively.

=== Computational ===
Computational methods have played a large role in understanding the nature of bonding in both molecular and solid-state systems displaying inverted ligand fields. The Hoffman group has completed many calculations to probe occurrence of inverted ligand fields in varying systems. In a study of the absorption of CO on PtBi and PtBi2 surfaces, on an octahedral [Pt(BiH_{3})_{6}]^{4+} model with a Pt thought of having a formal +4 oxidation state, the team found that the t_{2g} metal orbitals were higher energy that the e_{g} orbitals. This inversion of the d orbital ordering was attributed to the bismuth based ligands being higher in energy than the metal d orbitals. In another study involving calculations on Ag(III) salt KAgF_{4}, other Ag(II), and Ag(III) compounds, the Ag d orbitals were found to be below those of the fluoride ligand orbitals, and was confirmed by Grochala and cowrokers by core and valence spectroscopies.

The Mealli group developed the program Computer Aided Composition of Atomic Orbitals (CACAO) to provide visualised molecular orbitals analyses based on perturbation theory principles. This program successfully displayed orbital energy inversion with organometallic complexes containing electronegative metals such as Ni or Cu bound to electropositive ligand atoms such as B, Si, or Sn. In these cases the bonding was described as a ligand to metal dative bond or sigma backdonation.

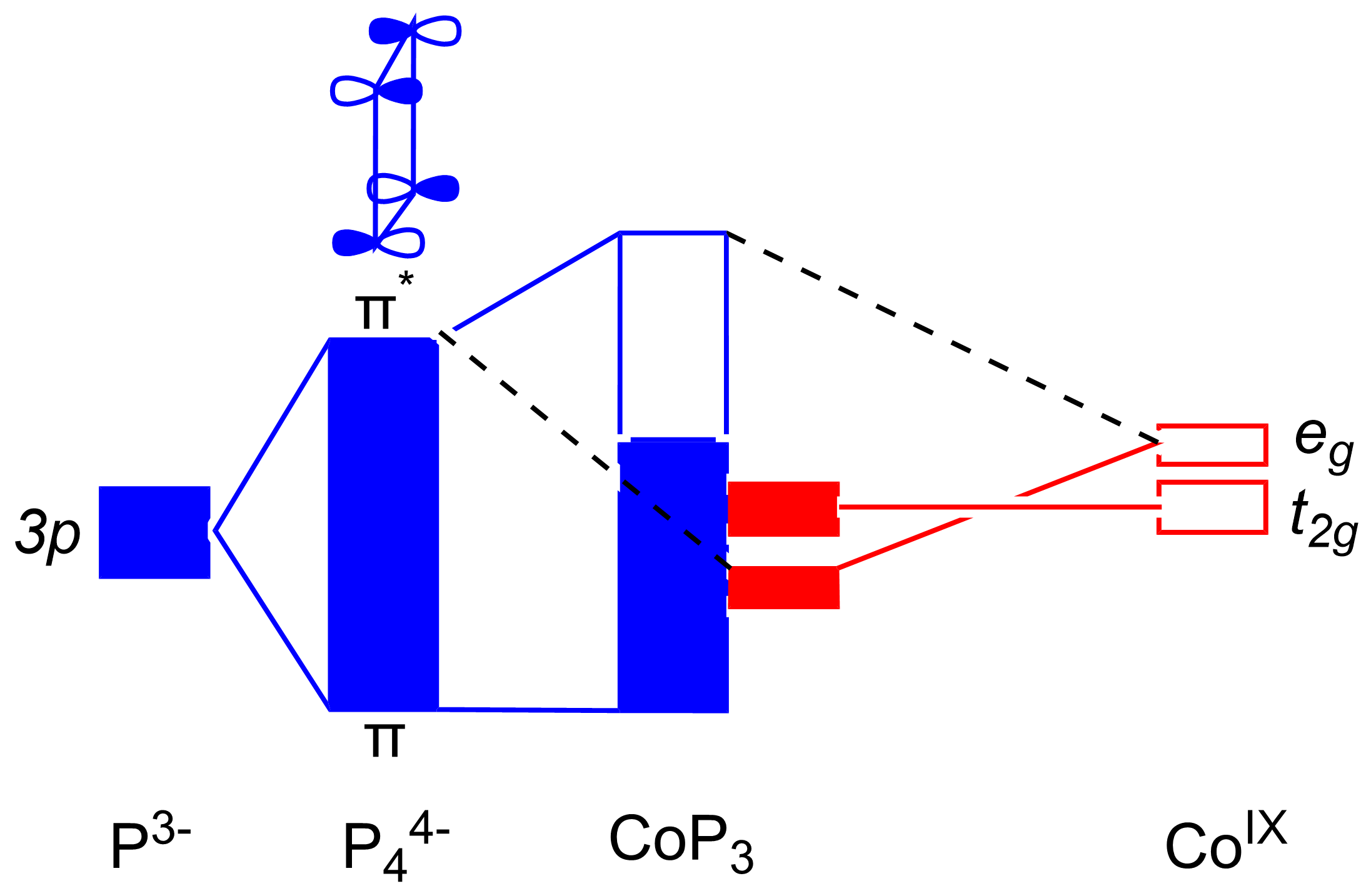
Interaction of the filled p band of P^{4−}_{4} ring sublattice with Co d block bands in CoP_{3}.

Alvarez and coworkers used computational methods to illustrate ligand field inversion in the band structures of solid state materials. The group found that, contrary to the classical bonding scheme, in calculated MoNiP_{8} band structures the e_{g}-type orbitals of the octahedral nickel atom were found to be the major component of an occupied band below the t_{2g} set. Additionally, the band around the fermi level which included the Ni^{+} antibonding orbitals were found to be mostly of phosphorus character, a clear example if an inverted ligand field. Similar observations were made in other solid state materials like the skutterudite CoP_{3} structure. A consequence of the inverted ligand field in this case is that the conductivity in skutterudites is associated with the phosphorus rings rather than the metal atoms.

=== Experimental ===
X-ray absorption spectroscopy (XAS) has been a powerful tool in deducing the oxidation states of transition metals. Energy shifts in XAS are higher due to the higher effective nuclear charge of atoms in higher oxidations, presumably due to the higher binding energy for deeper, more core-like electrons.

Despite this being a very powerful technique, competing effects on the rising edge positions can make assignment difficult. It was initially thought that the weak, quadrupole-allowed pre-edge peak assigned as the Cu 1s to 3d transition could be used to distinguish between Cu(II) and Cu(III) with the features appearing at 8979 ±0.3 eV and 8981 ±0.5 eV, respectively. Ab initio calculations by Tomson, Wieghardt, and co-workers displayed that pre-peaks previously assigned as Cu(III) could be displayed by Cu(II) bearing complexes. Many groups have displayed that metal K-edge XAS transitions involving ligand-localised acceptor orbitals, as well as spectral shifts from change in coordination environment, can make metal K-edge analysis less predictable.

The most successful use of K and L-edge XAS provide valuable information on the composition of molecular orbitals and display inverted ligand fields has been done in studies that made use of computational techniques in concert with experimental techniques. This was the case of the L_{2}[Cu_{2}(S_{2})_{n}]^{2+} complexes of York, Brown, and Tolman, and the Cu(CF_{3})^{4−} by various groups including Hoffman, Overgaard, and Lancaster.

Another experimental tool used to probe ligand field inversion includes Electron paramagnetic resonance (ESR/EPR), which can provide information regarding the metal electronic configuration, the nature of the SOMO, and high resolution information on the ligands.

== Impact of charge and geometry ==
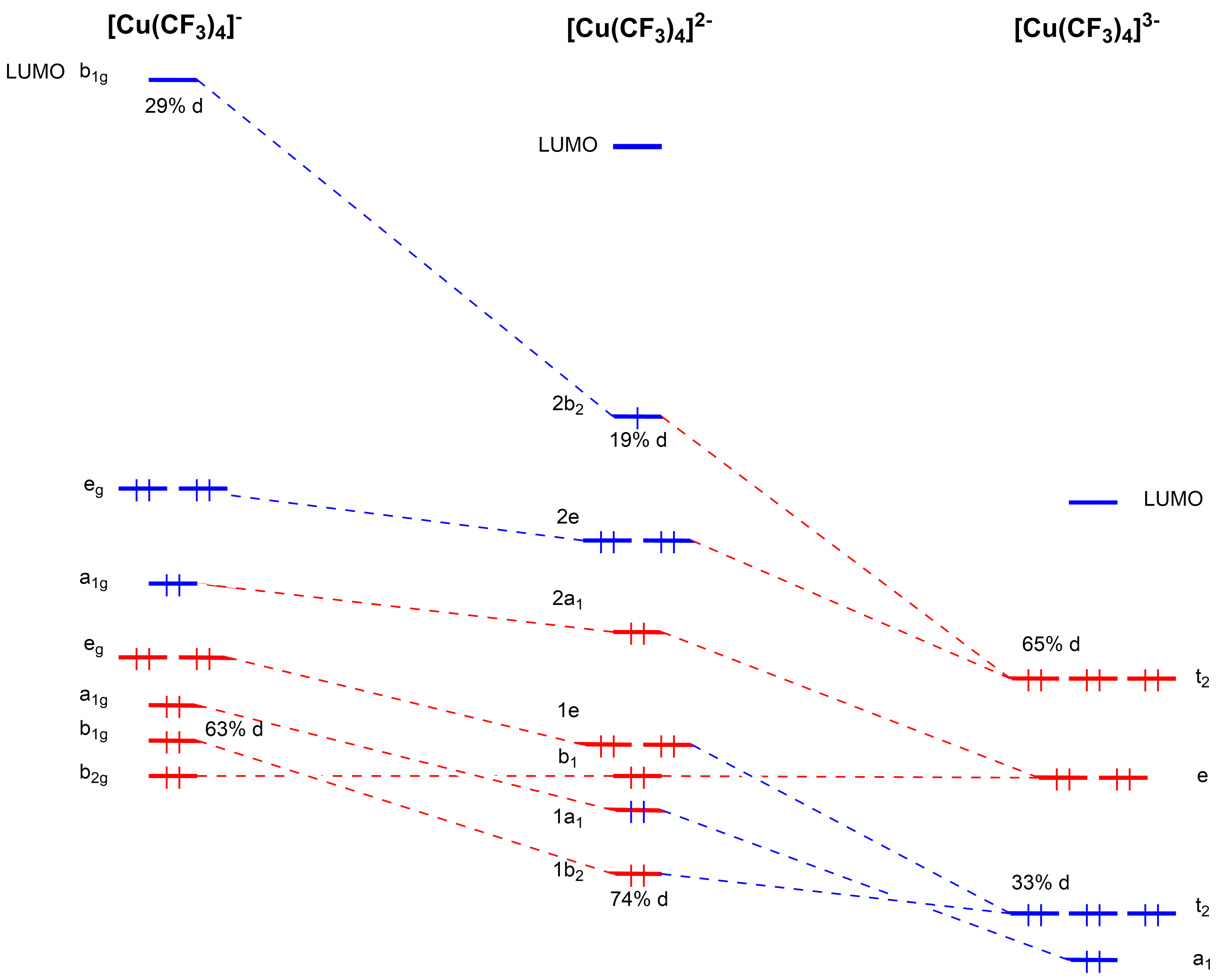
MO diagrams of frontier orbitals of [Cu(CF_{3})_{4})^{n−} anions.

Changes in both charge and geometry of organometallic complexes can greatly vary the energies of molecular orbitals and can therefore dictate the likelihood of observing an inverted ligand field. Hoffman and coworkers explored the impact of these variables by calculating the atomic composition of molecular orbitals for mono- di- and trianion copper complexes. The square planar monoanion displayed the reported ligand field inversion. The "Cu(II)" which has an intermediate square planar to tetrahedral geometry also displayed this feature with the antibonding t_{2}-derived orbital being mostly of ligand character and the x^{2}-y^{2} orbital being the lowest molecular orbital of the d block. The tetrahedral trianion showed a return to the Werner-type ligand field. By modulating the geometry of the "Cu(II)" species and displaying the change in energies of MO on Walsh diagrams, the group was able to show how the complex could display both a classical and inverted ligand field when in T_{d} and SP geometry respectively. Additional calculations on the Cu(I) with non-tetrahedral geometry also displayed an inverted ligand field. This indicated the importance of not just oxidation state but geometry in determining the inversion of a ligand field.

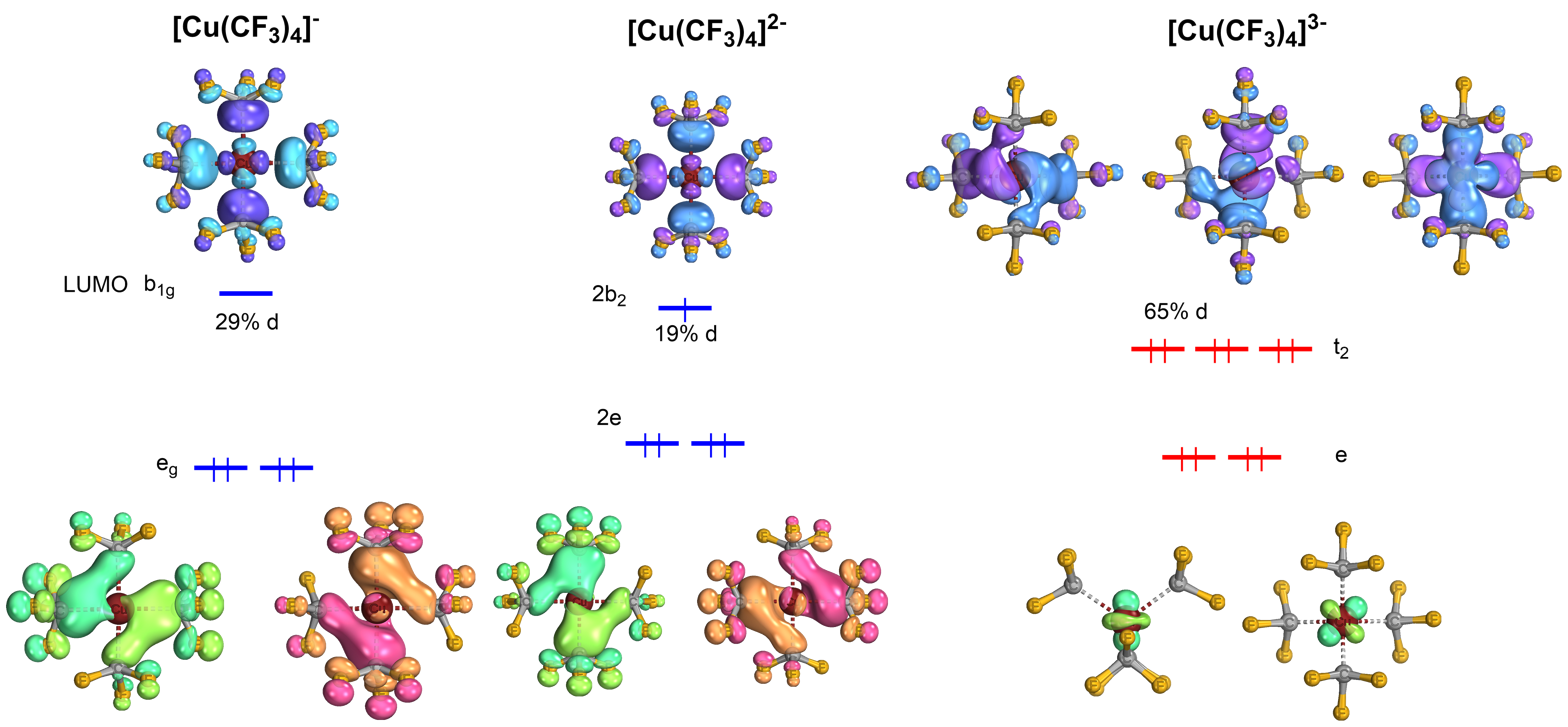
Frontier orbitals of mono-, di-, and trianionic [Cu(CF_{3})_{4}]^{n−} calculated with the B3LYP functional using a D3BJ def2-TZVP(-f) basis and visualised by IboView.

== Consequences on bonding ==
The inversion of ligand fields has interesting implications on the nature of reactivity of organometallic complexes. This sigma non-innocence of ligands arising from inverted ligand fields could therefore be used to tune reactivity of complexes and open space in understanding the mechanisms of existing reactions.

In an analysis of the [ZnF_{4}]^{2−} , it was found that due to ligand field inversion displayed in this species, core ionization removes an electron from the metal-rich bonding t_{2} orbital, lengthening the Zn–F bonds. This is contrary to the classical ligand field where ionization would remove an electron from the antibonding t_{2} orbital shortening the Zn–F bonds.

The presence of electron-deficient ligands also result in an inverted ligand field. Calculations have shown that the large O 2p contribution into the LUMO/LUMO^{+1} in [(L^{TEED}Cu)_{2}(O_{2})]^{2+} should make the complex highly oxidizing as it contains electron deficient O^{2−} ligands. Studies have corroborated this property as this complex has shown to be able to undergo C–H and C–F activation and aromatic hydroxylation.

There is evidence showing that reductive elimination on species displaying ligand field inversion do not undergo a redox event at the metal center. The C-CF_{3} bond formation by "Ni(IV)" complexes was completed without redox participation of the Nickel. The metal appears to remain Ni(II) throughout the reaction. The mechanism is thought to be through the attack of a masked electrophilic cation by anionic CF_{3}. The electron deficiency here is due to the inverted ligand field.
