= Sigma-pi and equivalent-orbital models =

Concepts in chemistry

The σ-π model and equivalent-orbital model are two possible representations of molecules in valence bond theory. The σ-π model differentiates bonds and lone pairs of σ symmetry from those of π symmetry, while the equivalent-orbital model hybridizes them. The σ-π treatment takes into account molecular symmetry and is better suited to interpretation of aromatic molecules (Hückel's rule), although computational calculations of certain molecules tend to optimize better under the equivalent-orbital treatment. The two representations produce the same total electron density and are related by a unitary transformation of the occupied molecular orbitals; different localization procedures yield either of the two. Two equivalent orbitals h and h' can be constructed by taking linear combinations h = c_{1}σ + c_{2}π and h' = c_{1}σ – c_{2}π for an appropriate choice of coefficients c_{1} and c_{2}.

In a 1996 review, Kenneth B. Wiberg concluded that "although a conclusive statement cannot be made on the basis of the currently available information, it seems likely that we can continue to consider the σ/π and bent-bond descriptions of ethylene to be equivalent. Ian Fleming goes further in a 2010 textbook, noting that "the overall distribution of electrons [...] is exactly the same" in the two models. Nevertheless, as pointed out in Carroll's textbook, at lower levels of theory, the two models make different quantitative and qualitative predictions, and there has been considerable debate as to which model is most useful conceptually and pedagogically.

== Multiple bonds ==
Two different explanations for the nature of double and triple covalent bonds in organic molecules were proposed in the 1930s. Linus Pauling proposed that the double bond in ethylene results from two equivalent tetrahedral orbitals from each atom, which later came to be called banana bonds or tau bonds. Erich Hückel proposed a representation of the double bond as a combination of a sigma bond plus a pi bond. The σ-π representation is the better-known one, and it is the one found in most textbooks since the late-20th century.

== Multiple lone pairs ==
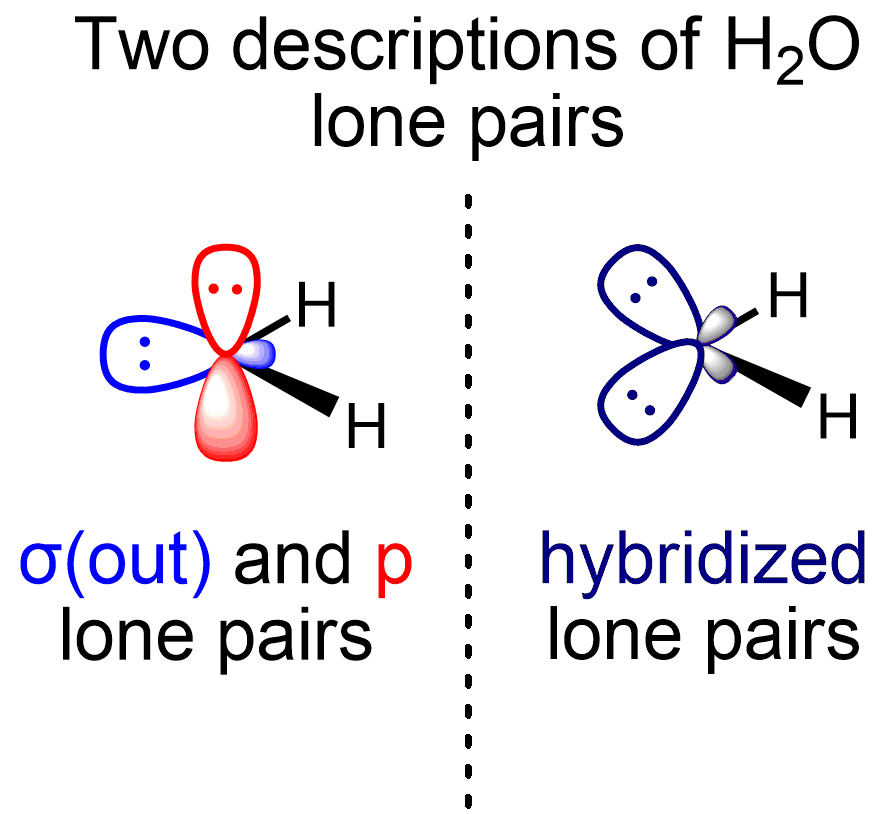
The symmetry-adapted and hybridized lone pairs of H_{2}O

Initially, Linus Pauling's scheme of water as presented in his hallmark paper on valence bond theory consists of two inequivalent lone pairs of σ and π symmetry. As a result of later developments resulting partially from the introduction of VSEPR, an alternative view arose which considers the two lone pairs to be equivalent, colloquially called rabbit ears.

Weinhold and Landis describe the symmetry adapted use of the orbital hybridization concept within the context of natural bond orbitals, a localized orbital theory containing modernized analogs of classical (valence bond/Lewis structure) bonding pairs and lone pairs. For the hydrogen fluoride molecule, for example, two F lone pairs are essentially unhybridized p orbitals of π symmetry, while the other is an sp^{x} hydrid orbital of σ symmetry. An analogous consideration applies to water (one O lone pair is in a pure p orbital, another is in an sp^{x} hybrid orbital).

The question of whether it is conceptually useful to derive equivalent orbitals from symmetry-adapted ones, from the standpoint of bonding theory and pedagogy, is still a controversial one, with recent (2014 and 2015) articles opposing and supporting the practice.
