= Mulliken population analysis =

Method in computational chemistry

Mulliken charges arise from the Mulliken population analysis and provide a means of estimating partial atomic charges from calculations carried out by the methods of computational chemistry, particularly those based on the linear combination of atomic orbitals molecular orbital method, and are routinely used as variables in linear regression (QSAR) procedures. The method was developed by Robert S. Mulliken, after whom the method is named. If the coefficients of the basis functions in the molecular orbital are C_{μi} for the μ'th basis function in the i'th molecular orbital, the density matrix terms are:

$$\mathbf {D_{\mu\nu}} = \mathbf{2}\sum_{i}  \mathbf {C_{\mu i}} \mathbf {C_{\nu i}^*}$$

for a closed shell system where each molecular orbital is doubly occupied. The population matrix $\mathbf{P}$ then has terms

$$\mathbf {P_{\mu\nu}} =  \mathbf {D_{\mu\nu}} \mathbf {S_{\mu\nu}}$$

$\mathbf{S}$ is the overlap matrix of the basis functions. The sum of all terms of $\mathbf {P_{\nu\mu}}$ summed over $\mathbf {\mu}$ is the gross orbital product for orbital $\mathbf {\nu}$ - $\mathbf {GOP_{\nu}}$. The sum of the gross orbital products is N - the total number of electrons. The Mulliken population assigns an electronic charge to a given atom A, known as the gross atom population: $\mathbf {GAP_{A}}$ as the sum of $\mathbf {GOP_{\nu}}$ over all orbitals $\mathbf {\nu}$ belonging to atom A. The charge, $\mathbf {Q_{A}}$, is then defined as the difference between the number of electrons on the isolated free atom, which is the atomic number $\mathbf {Z_{A}}$, and the gross atom population:

$$\mathbf {Q_{A}} = \mathbf {Z_{A}} - \mathbf {GAP_{A}}$$

== Mathematical problems ==
=== Off-diagonal terms ===
One problem with this approach is the equal division of the off-diagonal terms between the two basis functions. This leads to charge separations in molecules that are exaggerated. In a modified Mulliken population analysis, this problem can be reduced by dividing the overlap populations $\mathbf {P_{\mu\nu}}$ between the corresponding orbital populations $\mathbf {P_{\mu\mu}}$ and $\mathbf {P_{\nu\nu}}$ in the ratio between the latter. This choice, although still arbitrary, relates the partitioning in some way to the electronegativity difference between the corresponding atoms.

=== Ill definition ===
Another problem is the Mulliken charges are explicitly sensitive to the basis set choice. In principle, a complete basis set for a molecule can be spanned by placing a large set of functions on a single atom. In the Mulliken scheme, all the electrons would then be assigned to this atom. The method thus has no complete basis set limit, as the exact value depends on the way the limit is approached. This also means that the charges are ill defined, as there is no exact answer. As a result, the basis set convergence of the charges does not exist, and different basis set families may yield drastically different results.

These problems can be addressed by modern methods for computing net atomic charges, such as density derived electrostatic and chemical (DDEC) analysis, intrinsic atomic orbitals, electrostatic potential analysis, and natural population analysis.

== See also ==
- Partial charge, for other methods used to estimate atomic charges in molecules.
- Chirgwin-Coulson weights, orbital overlap used to compute Mulliken populations
