= Distonic ion =

A distonic ion, showing that the molecule's radical site and charge are in different locations

Distonic ions are chemical species that contain ionic charges and radical sites in different locations (on separate atoms), unlike regular radicals where the formal charge and unpaired electron are in the same location. These molecular species are created by ionization of either zwitterions or diradicals; ultimately, a neutral molecule loses an electron. Through experimental research distonic radicals have been found to be extremely stable gas phase ions and can be separated into different classes depending on the inherent features of the charged portion of the ion.

== History ==
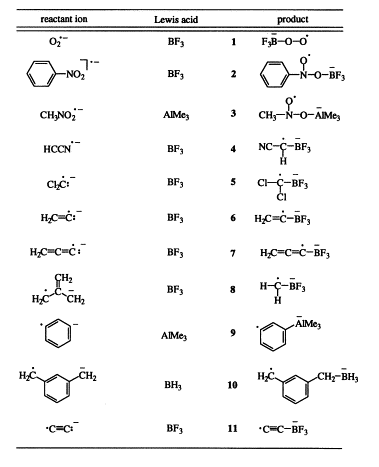
Example of distonic ions in the class -ate

In 1984 scientists Bouma, Radom and Yates originated the term through extensive experimental research but they were not the first to deal with distonic ions. Experiments date back to the 1970s with Gross and McLafferty who were the first to propose the idea of such a species.

== Ion structure ==
Several efficient techniques are available to detect the presence of distonic ions; the most appropriate method will depend on the ion's internal energy and lifespan. Collisions between ions and uncharged molecules allow one to detect the location of the radical and charge site in order to confirm that the ion is not just a regular radical ion. When a molecule is ionized and can structurally be classified as a distonic ion, the molecule's kinetics and thermodynamic properties have been greatly altered. However, additional chemical properties are based on the reactions of the central excited ions. Mass spectrometry techniques are used to study their chemistry.

== Experimental data ==
Distonic ions have been extensively examined due to their unique behavior and how commonly they can occur. It has been shown that in most cases distonic ions have a bonding arrangement corresponding to that of the original molecule before ionization occurred; but that distonic ions are less stable than before ionization occurred; even so, distonic ions are considered stable ions and have caught many scientists' attention because they possess more stability than its traditional isomer. It may be difficult to decipher the functions of the charge and radical site because distonic ions are limited to elementary reactions such as unimolecular reactions involving highly excited and short-lived species.
