= Partial charge =

Electric charge which is not an integer multiple of elementary charge

In atomic physics, a partial charge (or net atomic charge) is a non-integer charge value when measured in elementary charge units. It is represented by the Greek lowercase delta (𝛿), namely 𝛿− or 𝛿+.

Partial charges are created due to the asymmetric distribution of electrons in chemical bonds. For example, in a polar covalent bond like HCl, the shared electron oscillates between the bonded atoms. The resulting partial charges are a property only of zones within the distribution, and not the assemblage as a whole. For example, chemists often choose to look at a small space surrounding the nucleus of an atom: When an electrically neutral atom bonds chemically to another neutral atom that is more electronegative, its electrons are partially drawn away. This leaves the region about that atom's nucleus with a partial positive charge, and it creates a partial negative charge on the atom to which it is bonded.

$\ce{H3\overset{\delta+}C-\overset{\delta-}Cl \qquad H3\overset{\delta-}C-\overset{\delta+}Mg\overset{\delta-}Cl}$
Polarity of chloromethane (left)
and of the related Grignard compound
with indication of the partial charge.

In such a situation, the distributed charges taken as a group always carries a whole number of elementary charge units. Yet one can point to zones within the assemblage where less than a full charge resides, such as the area around an atom's nucleus. This is possible in part because particles are not like mathematical points—which must be either inside a zone or outside it—but are smeared out by the uncertainty principle of quantum mechanics. Because of this smearing effect, if one defines a sufficiently small zone, a fundamental particle may be both partly inside and partly outside it.

== Uses ==
Partial atomic charges are used in molecular mechanics force fields to compute the electrostatic interaction energy using Coulomb's law, even though this leads to substantial failures for anisotropic charge distributions. Partial charges are also often used for a qualitative understanding of the structure and reactivity of molecules.

Occasionally, δδ+ is used to indicate a partial charge that is less positively charged than δ+ (likewise for δδ−) in cases where it is relevant to do so. This can be extended to δδδ± to indicate even weaker partial charges as well. Generally, a single δ+ (or δ−) is sufficient for most discussions of partial charge in organic chemistry.

== Determining partial atomic charges ==
Partial atomic charges can be used to quantify the degree of ionic versus covalent bonding of any compound across the periodic table. The necessity for such quantities arises, for example, in molecular simulations to compute bulk and surface properties in agreement with experiment. Evidence for chemically different compounds shows that available experimental data and chemical understanding lead to justified atomic charges. Atomic charges for a given compound can be derived in multiple ways, such as:

1. extracted from electron densities measured using high resolution x-ray, gamma ray, or electron beam diffraction experiments
2. measured dipole moments
3. the Extended Born thermodynamic cycle, including an analysis of covalent and ionic bonding contributions
4. spectroscopically measured properties, such as core-electron binding energy shifts
5. the relationship of atomic charges to melting points, solubility, and cleavage energies for a set of similar compounds with similar degree of covalent bonding
6. the relationship of atomic charges to chemical reactivity and reaction mechanisms for similar compounds reported in the literature.

The discussion of individual compounds in prior work has shown convergence in atomic charges, i.e., a high level of consistency between the assigned degree of polarity and the physical-chemical properties mentioned above. The resulting uncertainty in atomic charges is ±0.1e to ±0.2e for highly charged compounds, and often <0.1e for compounds with atomic charges below ±1.0e. Often, the application of one or two of the above concepts already leads to very good values, especially taking into account a growing library of experimental benchmark compounds and compounds with tested force fields.

The published research literature on partial atomic charges varies in quality from extremely poor to extremely well-done. Although a large number of different methods for assigning partial atomic charges from quantum chemistry calculations have been proposed over many decades, the vast majority of proposed methods do not work well across a wide variety of material types. Only as recently as 2016 was a method for theoretically computing partial atomic charges developed that performs consistently well across an extremely wide variety of material types. All of the earlier methods had fundamental deficiencies that prevented them from assigning accurate partial atomic charges in many materials. Mulliken and Löwdin partial charges are physically unreasonable, because they do not have a mathematical limit as the basis set is improved towards completeness. Hirshfeld partial charges are usually too low in magnitude. Some methods for assigning partial atomic charges do not converge to a unique solution. In some materials, atoms in molecules analysis yields non-nuclear attractors describing electron density partitions that cannot be assigned to any atom in the material; in such cases, atoms in molecules analysis cannot assign partial atomic charges.

According to Cramer (2002), partial charge methods can be divided into four classes:

- Class I charges are those that are not determined from quantum mechanics, but from some intuitive or arbitrary approach. These approaches can be based on experimental data such as dipoles and electronegativities.
- Class II charges are derived from partitioning the molecular wave function using some arbitrary, orbital based scheme.
- Class III charges are based on a partitioning of a physical observable derived from the wave function, such as electron density.
- Class IV charges are derived from a semiempirical mapping of a precursor charge of type II or III to reproduce experimentally determined observables such as dipole moments.

The following is a detailed list of methods, partly based on Meister and Schwarz (1994).

- Population analysis of wavefunctions
  - Mulliken population analysis
  - Löwdin population analysis
  - Coulson's charges
  - Natural charges
  - CM1, CM2, CM3, CM4, and CM5 charge models
- Partitioning of electron density distributions
  - Bader charges (obtained from an atoms in molecules analysis)
  - Density fitted atomic charges
  - Hirshfeld charges
  - Maslen's corrected Bader charges
  - Politzer's charges
  - Voronoi Deformation Density charges
  - Density Derived Electrostatic and Chemical (DDEC) charges, which simultaneously reproduce the chemical states of atoms in a material and the electrostatic potential surrounding the material's electron density distribution
- Charges derived from dipole-dependent properties
  - Dipole charges
  - Dipole derivative charges, also called atomic polar tensor (APT) derived charges, or Born, Callen, or Szigeti effective charges
- Charges derived from electrostatic potential
  - Chelp
  - ChelpG (Breneman model)
  - Merz-Singh-Kollman (also known as Merz-Kollman, or MK)
  - RESP (Restrained Electrostatic Potential)
- Charges derived from spectroscopic data
  - Charges from infrared intensities
  - Charges from X-ray photoelectron spectroscopy (ESCA)
  - Charges from X-ray emission spectroscopy
  - Charges from X-ray absorption spectra
  - Charges from ligand-field splittings
  - Charges from UV-vis intensities of transition metal complexes
  - Charges from other spectroscopies, such as NMR, EPR, EQR
- Charges from other experimental data
  - Charges from bandgaps or dielectric constants
  - Apparent charges from the piezoelectric effect
  - Charges derived from adiabatic potential energy curves
  - Electronegativity-based charges
  - Other physicochemical data, such as equilibrium and reaction rate constants, thermochemistry, and liquid densities.
- Formal charges
