= Born–Mayer equation =

The Born–Mayer equation is an equation that is used to calculate the lattice energy of a crystalline ionic compound. It is a refinement of the Born–Landé equation by using an improved repulsion term.

$$U_{lat}  =- \frac{N_AMz^+z^- e^2 }{4 \pi \epsilon_0 r_0}\left(1-\frac{\rho}{r_0}\right)$$

where:

- N_{A} = Avogadro constant;
- M = Madelung constant, relating to the geometry of the crystal;
- z^{+} = charge number of cation
- z^{−} = charge number of anion
- e = elementary charge, 1.6022×10^{−19} C
- ε_{0} = permittivity of free space
  4πε_{0} = 1.112×10^{−10} C^{2}/(J·m)
- r_{0} = distance to closest ion
- ρ = a constant dependent on the compressibility of the crystal; 30 pm works well for all alkali metal halides

== See also ==
- Born–Landé equation
- Kapustinskii equation
