= Ionic bonding =

Chemical bonding involving attraction between ions

Sodium and fluorine atoms undergoing a redox reaction to form sodium ions and fluoride ions. Sodium loses its outer electron to give it a stable electron configuration, and this electron enters the fluorine atom exothermically. The oppositely charged ions – typically a great many of them – are then attracted to each other to form solid sodium fluoride.

Ionic bonding is a type of chemical bonding that involves the electrostatic attraction between oppositely charged ions, or between two atoms with sharply different electronegativities, and is the primary interaction occurring in ionic compounds. It is one of the main types of bonding, along with covalent bonding and metallic bonding. Ions are atoms (or groups of atoms) with an electrostatic charge. Atoms that gain electrons make negatively charged ions (called anions). Atoms that lose electrons make positively charged ions (called cations). This transfer of electrons is known as electrovalence in contrast to covalence. In the simplest case, the cation is a metal atom and the anion is a nonmetal atom, but these ions can be more complex, e.g. polyatomic ions like NH^{+}_{4} or SO^{2−}_{4}. In simpler words, an ionic bond results from the transfer of electrons from a metal to a non-metal to obtain a full valence shell for both atoms.

Clean ionic bonding – in which one atom or molecule completely transfers an electron to another – cannot exist: all ionic compounds have some degree of covalent bonding or electron sharing. Thus, the term "ionic bonding" is given when the ionic character is greater than the covalent character – that is, a bond in which there is a large difference in electronegativity between the cation and anion, causing the bonding to be more polar (ionic) than in covalent bonding where electrons are shared more equally. Bonds with partially ionic and partially covalent characters are called polar covalent bonds.

Ionic compounds conduct electricity when molten or in solution, typically not when solid. Ionic compounds generally have a high melting point, depending on the charge of the ions they consist of. The higher the charges the stronger the cohesive forces and the higher the melting point. They also tend to be soluble in water; the stronger the cohesive forces, the lower the solubility.

== Overview ==
Atoms that have an almost full or almost empty valence shell tend to be very reactive. Strongly electronegative atoms (such as halogens) often have only one or two empty electron states in their valence shell, and frequently bond with other atoms or gain electrons to form anions. Weakly electronegative atoms (such as alkali metals) have relatively few valence electrons, which can easily be lost to strongly electronegative atoms. As a result, weakly electronegative atoms tend to distort their electron cloud and form cations.

=== Properties of ionic bonds ===
- They are considered to be among the strongest of all types of chemical bonds. This often causes ionic compounds to be very stable.
- Ionic bonds have high bond energy. Bond energy is the mean amount of energy required to break the bond in the gaseous state.
- Most ionic compounds exist in the form of a crystal structure, in which the ions occupy the corners of the crystal. Such a structure is called a crystal lattice or as it is made of ions, an ionic lattice.
- Ionic compounds lose their crystal lattice structure and break up into ions when dissolved in water or any other polar solvent. This process is called solvation. The presence of these free ions makes aqueous ionic compound solutions good conductors of electricity. The same occurs when the compounds are heated above their melting point in a process known as melting.

== Formation ==
Ionic bonding can result from a redox reaction when atoms of an element (usually metal), whose ionization energy is low, give some of their electrons to achieve a stable electron configuration. In doing so, cations are formed. An atom of another element (usually nonmetal) with greater electron affinity accepts one or more electrons to attain a stable electron configuration, and after accepting electrons an atom becomes an anion. Typically, the stable electron configuration is one of the noble gases for elements in the s-block and the p-block, and particular stable electron configurations for d-block and f-block elements. The electrostatic attraction between the anions and cations leads to the formation of a solid with a crystallographic lattice in which the ions are stacked in an alternating fashion. In such a lattice, it is usually not possible to distinguish discrete molecular units, so that the compounds formed are not molecular. However, the ions themselves can be complex and form molecular ions like the acetate anion or the ammonium cation.

Representation of ionic bonding between lithium and fluorine to form lithium fluoride. Lithium has a low ionization energy and readily gives up its lone valence electron to a fluorine atom, which has a positive electron affinity and accepts the electron that was donated by the lithium atom. The end-result is that lithium is isoelectronic with helium and fluorine is isoelectronic with neon. Electrostatic interaction occurs between the two resulting ions, but typically aggregation is not limited to two of them. Instead, aggregation into a whole lattice held together by ionic bonding is the result.

For example, common table salt is sodium chloride. When sodium (Na) and chlorine (Cl) are combined, the sodium atoms each lose an electron, forming cations (Na^{+}), and the chlorine atoms each gain an electron to form anions (Cl^{−}). These ions are then attracted to each other in a 1:1 ratio to form sodium chloride (NaCl).

Na + Cl → Na^{+} + Cl^{−} → NaCl

However, to maintain charge neutrality, strict ratios between anions and cations are observed so that ionic compounds, in general, obey the rules of stoichiometry despite not being molecular compounds. For compounds that are transitional to the alloys and possess mixed ionic and metallic bonding, this may not be the case anymore. Many sulfides, e.g., do form non-stoichiometric compounds.

Many ionic compounds are referred to as salts as they can also be formed by the neutralization reaction of an Arrhenius base like NaOH with an Arrhenius acid like HCl

NaOH + HCl → NaCl + H_{2}O

The salt NaCl is then said to consist of the acid rest Cl^{−} and the base rest Na^{+}.

The removal of electrons to form the cation is endothermic, raising the system's overall energy. There may also be energy changes associated with breaking of existing bonds or the addition of more than one electron to form anions. However, the action of the anion's accepting the cation's valence electrons and the subsequent attraction of the ions to each other releases (lattice) energy and, thus, lowers the overall energy of the system.

Ionic bonding will occur only if the overall energy change for the reaction is favorable. In general, the reaction is exothermic, but, e.g., the formation of mercuric oxide (HgO) is endothermic. The charge of the resulting ions is a major factor in the strength of ionic bonding, e.g. a salt C^{+}A^{−} is held together by electrostatic forces roughly four times weaker than C^{2+}A^{2−} according to Coulomb's law, where C and A represent a generic cation and anion respectively. The sizes of the ions and the particular packing of the lattice are ignored in this rather simplistic argument.

== Structures ==
In the rock salt lattice, each sodium ion (purple sphere) has an electrostatic interaction with its six nearest-neighbour chloride ions (green spheres)

Ionic compounds in the solid state form lattice structures. The two principal factors in determining the form of the lattice are the relative charges of the ions and their relative sizes. Some structures are adopted by a number of compounds; for example, the structure of the rock salt sodium chloride is also adopted by many alkali halides, and binary oxides such as magnesium oxide. Pauling's rules provide guidelines for predicting and rationalizing the crystal structures of ionic crystals

== Strength of the bonding ==
For a solid crystalline ionic compound the enthalpy change in forming the solid from gaseous ions is termed the lattice energy. The experimental value for the lattice energy can be determined using the Born–Haber cycle. It can also be calculated (predicted) using the Born–Landé equation as the sum of the electrostatic potential energy, calculated by summing interactions between cations and anions, and a short-range repulsive potential energy term. The electrostatic potential can be expressed in terms of the interionic separation and a constant (Madelung constant) that takes account of the geometry of the crystal. The further away from the nucleus the weaker the shield. The Born–Landé equation gives a reasonable fit to the lattice energy of, e.g., sodium chloride, where the calculated (predicted) value is −756 kJ/mol, which compares to −787 kJ/mol using the Born–Haber cycle. In aqueous solution the binding strength can be described by the Bjerrum or Fuoss equation as function of the ion charges, rather independent of the nature of the ions such as polarizability or size. The strength of salt bridges is most often evaluated by measurements of equilibria between molecules containing cationic and anionic sites, most often in solution. Equilibrium constants in water indicate additive free energy contributions for each salt bridge. Another method for the identification of hydrogen bonds in complicated molecules is crystallography, sometimes also NMR-spectroscopy.

The attractive forces defining the strength of ionic bonding can be modeled by Coulomb's law. Ionic bond strengths are typically (cited ranges vary) between 170 and 1500 kJ/mol.

== Polarization power effects ==
Ions in crystal lattices of purely ionic compounds are spherical; however, if the positive ion is small and/or highly charged, it will distort the electron cloud of the negative ion, an effect summarized in Fajans' rules. This polarization of the negative ion leads to a build-up of extra charge density between the two nuclei, that is, to partial covalency. Larger negative ions are more easily polarized, but the effect is usually important only when positive ions with charges of 3+ (e.g., Al^{3+}) are involved. However, 2+ ions (Be^{2+}) or even 1+ (Li^{+}) show some polarizing power because their sizes are so small (e.g., LiI is ionic but has some covalent bonding present). Note that this is not the ionic polarization effect that refers to the displacement of ions in the lattice due to the application of an electric field.

== Comparison with covalent bonding ==
In ionic bonding, the atoms are bound by the attraction of oppositely charged ions, whereas, in covalent bonding, atoms are bound by sharing electrons to attain stable electron configurations. In covalent bonding, the molecular geometry around each atom is determined by valence shell electron pair repulsion VSEPR rules, whereas, in ionic materials, the geometry follows maximum packing rules. One could say that covalent bonding is more directional in the sense that the energy penalty for not adhering to the optimum bond angles is large, whereas ionic bonding has no such penalty. There are no shared electron pairs to repel each other, the ions should simply be packed as efficiently as possible. This often leads to much higher coordination numbers. In NaCl, each ion has 6 bonds and all bond angles are 90°. In CsCl the coordination number is 8. By comparison, carbon typically has a maximum of four bonds.

Purely ionic bonding cannot exist, as the proximity of the entities involved in the bonding allows some degree of sharing electron density between them. Therefore, all ionic bonding has some covalent character. Thus, bonding is considered ionic where the ionic character is greater than the covalent character. The larger the difference in electronegativity between the two types of atoms involved in the bonding, the more ionic (polar) it is. Bonds with partially ionic and partially covalent character are called polar covalent bonds. For example, Na–Cl and Mg–O interactions have a few percent covalency, while Si–O bonds are usually ~50% ionic and ~50% covalent. Pauling estimated that an electronegativity difference of 1.7 (on the Pauling scale) corresponds to 50% ionic character, so that a difference greater than 1.7 corresponds to a bond which is predominantly ionic.

Ionic character in covalent bonds can be directly measured for atoms having quadrupolar nuclei (^{2}H, ^{14}N, ^{81,79}Br, ^{35,37}Cl or ^{127}I). These nuclei are generally objects of NQR nuclear quadrupole resonance and NMR nuclear magnetic resonance studies. Interactions between the nuclear quadrupole moments Q and the electric field gradients (EFG) are characterized via the nuclear quadrupole coupling constants

QCC = e^{2}q_{zz}Q/h

where the eq_{zz} term corresponds to the principal component of the EFG tensor and e is the elementary charge. In turn, the electric field gradient opens the way to description of bonding modes in molecules when the QCC values are accurately determined by NMR or NQR methods.

In general, when ionic bonding occurs in the solid (or liquid) state, it is not possible to talk about a single "ionic bond" between two individual atoms, because the cohesive forces that keep the lattice together are of a more collective nature. This is quite different in the case of covalent bonding, where we can often speak of a distinct bond localized between two particular atoms. However, even if ionic bonding is combined with some covalency, the result is not necessarily discrete bonds of a localized character. In such cases, the resulting bonding often requires description in terms of a band structure consisting of gigantic molecular orbitals spanning the entire crystal. Thus, the bonding in the solid often retains its collective rather than localized nature. When the difference in electronegativity is decreased, the bonding may then lead to a semiconductor, a semimetal or eventually a metallic conductor with metallic bonding.

== See also ==
- Coulomb's law
- Salt bridge (protein and supramolecular)
- Ionic potential
- Linear combination of atomic orbitals
- Hybridization
- Chemical polarity
- Ioliomics
- Electron configuration
- Aufbau principle
- Quantum numbers
  - Azimuthal quantum number
  - Principal quantum number
  - Magnetic quantum number
  - Spin quantum number
