= Charge number =

For a particle, quotient of its electric charge and the elementary charge

Charge number (denoted $z$) is a quantized and dimensionless quantity derived from electric charge, with the quantum of electric charge being the elementary charge ($e$, constant). The charge number equals the electric charge ($q$, in coulombs) divided by the elementary charge: $z = q / e$. Atomic numbers ($Z$) are a special case of charge numbers, referring to the charge number of an atomic nucleus, as opposed to the net charge of an atom or ion. The charge numbers for ions (and also subatomic particles) are written in superscript, e.g., Na^{+} is a sodium ion with charge number positive one (an electric charge of one elementary charge). All particles of ordinary matter have integer-value charge numbers, with the exception of quarks, which cannot exist in isolation under ordinary circumstances (the strong force keeps them bound into hadrons of integer charge numbers).

== Charge numbers in chemistry ==
Charge number or valence of an ion is the coefficient that, when multiplied by the elementary charge, gives the ion's charge.

For example, the charge on a chloride ion, $\mathrm{Cl}^-$, is $-1 \cdot e$, where $e$ is the elementary charge. This means that the charge number for the ion is $-1$.

$z$ is used as the symbol for the charge number. In that case, the charge of an ion could be written as $Q = z e$.

The charge number in chemistry normally relates to an electric charge. This is a property of specific subatomic atoms. These elements define the electromagnetic contact between the two elements.

A chemical charge can be found by using the periodic table. An element's placement on the periodic table indicates whether its chemical charge is negative or positive. Looking at the table, one can see that the positive charges are on the left side of the table and the negative charges are on the right side of the table. Charges that are positive are called cations. Charges that are negative are called anions. Elements in the same group have the same charge. A group in the periodic table is a term used to represent the vertical columns.

The noble gases of the periodic table do not have a charge because they are nonreactive. Noble gases are considered stable since they contain the desired eight electrons. The other atoms or ions have charges because they are very reactive and want to react with another atom or ion to become stable. When elements are bonded, they can either be bonded by ionic bonding or covalent bonding. When elements bond between positive and negative charged atoms, their charges will be switched and carried down on the other element to combine them equally. This is shown below. Using the chart provided, if ammonium with a plus 1 charge is combined with an acetate ion with a negative 1 charge, the charges will be cancelled out, shown in the figure below.

$$\ce{NH4+ + C2H3O2^- -> NC2H7O2}$$

Another example below.

$$\ce{2 NH4+ + CO3^2- -> (NH4)2CO3}$$

both $\ce{NC2H7O2}$ and $\ce{(NH4)2CO3}$ are salts.

Charge numbers also help to determine other aspects of chemistry. One example is that someone can use the charge of an ion to find the oxidation number of a monatomic ion. For example, the oxidation number of $\ce{Li+}$ is +1. This helps when trying to solve oxidation questions.

A charge number also can help when drawing Lewis dot structures. For example, if the structure is an ion, the charge will be included outside of the Lewis dot structure.

Since there is a negative charge on the outside of the Lewis dot structure, one electron needs to be added to the structure. If the charge was positive, an electron would be lost and taken away.

== Charge numbers in nuclear and hadron physics ==
For an atomic nucleus, which can be regarded as an ion having stripped off all electrons, the charge number is identical with the atomic number Z, which corresponds to the number of protons in ordinary atomic nuclei.

Unlike in chemistry, subatomic particles with electric charges of two elementary charges (e.g. some delta baryons) are indicated with a superscript "++" or "−−". In chemistry, the same charge numbers are usually indicated as superscript "+2" or "−2".

== Charge numbers in elementary-particle physics ==
In particle physics, the charge number is a (derived) flavor quantum number. For color-charged particles like quarks and hypothetical leptoquarks, the charge number is a multiple of 1/3.

== See also ==
- quantum number
- mass-to-charge ratio
- oxidation
- ionization
- anion
- cation
- magnetic charge
