= Kapustinskii equation =

Formula for lattice energy

The Kapustinskii equation calculates the lattice energy U_{L} for an ionic crystal, which is experimentally difficult to determine. It is named after Anatoli Fedorovich Kapustinskii who published the formula in 1956.

$$U_{lat} = {K} \cdot \frac{\nu \cdot |z^+| \cdot |z^-|}{r^+ + r^-} \cdot \biggl( 1 - \frac{d}{r^+ + r^-} \biggr)$$

| where | K = 1.20200×10^{−4} J·m·mol^{−1} |
| | d = 3.45×10^{−11} m |
| | ν is the number of ions in the empirical formula, |
| | z^{+} and z^{−} are the numbers of elementary charge on the cation and anion, respectively, and |
| | r^{+} and r^{−} are the radii of the cation and anion, respectively, in meters. |

The calculated lattice energy gives a good estimation for the Born–Landé equation; the real value differs in most cases by less than 5%.

Furthermore, one is able to determine the ionic radii (or more properly, the thermochemical radius) using the Kapustinskii equation when the lattice energy is known. This is useful for rather complex ions like sulfate (SO^{2−}_{4}) or phosphate (PO^{3−}_{4}).

== Derivation from the Born–Landé equation ==
Kapustinskii originally proposed the following simpler form, which he faulted as "associated with antiquated concepts of the character of repulsion forces".

$$U_{lat} = {K'} \cdot \frac{\nu \cdot |z^+| \cdot |z^-|}{r^+ + r^-}$$

Here, K' = 1.079×10^{−4} J·m·mol^{−1}. This form of the Kapustinskii equation may be derived as an approximation of the Born–Landé equation, below.

$$U_{lat} =- \frac{N_AMz^+z^- e^2 }{4 \pi \epsilon_0 r_0}\left(1-\frac{1}{n}\right)$$

Kapustinskii replaced r_{0}, the measured distance between ions, with the sum of the corresponding ionic radii. In addition, the Born exponent, n, was assumed to have a mean value of 9. Finally, Kapustinskii noted that the Madelung constant, M, was approximately 0.88 times the number of ions in the empirical formula. The derivation of the later form of the Kapustinskii equation followed similar logic, starting from the quantum chemical treatment in which the final term is 1 − d/r_{0} where d is as defined above. Replacing r_{0} as before yields the full Kapustinskii equation.

== See also ==
- Born–Haber cycle

== Literature ==
- Kapustinsky, A. (1933-01-01). "Allgemeine Formel für die Gitterenergie von Kristallen beliebiger Struktur". Zeitschrift für Physikalische Chemie (in German). 22B (1). Walter de Gruyter GmbH: 257. doi:10.1515/zpch-1933-2220. ISSN 2196-7156. S2CID 202045251.
- A. F. Kapustinskii; Zhur. Fiz. Khim. Nr. 5, 1943, pp. 59 ff.
