= Salt (chemistry) =

Chemical compound involving ionic bonding

The crystal structure of sodium chloride, NaCl, a typical salt. The purple spheres represent sodium cations, Na^{+}, and the green spheres represent chloride anions, Cl^{−}. The yellow stipples show the electrostatic forces.

In chemistry, a salt or ionic compound is a chemical compound consisting of an assembly of positively charged ions (cations) and negatively charged ions (anions), which results in a compound with no net electric charge. The constituent ions are held together by electrostatic forces termed ionic bonds.

The component ions in a salt can be either inorganic, such as chloride (Cl^{−}), or organic, such as acetate (CH_{3}COO^{−}). Each ion can be either monatomic, such as sodium (Na^{+}) and chloride (Cl^{−}) in sodium chloride, or polyatomic, such as ammonium (NH^{+}_{4}) and carbonate (CO^{2−}_{3}) ions in ammonium carbonate. Salts containing basic ions hydroxide (OH^{−}) or oxide (O^{2−}) are classified as bases, such as sodium hydroxide and potassium oxide.

Individual ions within a salt usually have multiple near neighbours, so they are not considered to be part of molecules, but instead part of a continuous three-dimensional network. Salts usually form crystalline structures when solid.

Salts composed of small ions typically have high melting and boiling points, and are hard and brittle. As solids they are almost always electrically insulating, but when melted or dissolved they become highly conductive, because the ions become mobile. Some salts have large cations, large anions, or both. In terms of their properties, such species often are more similar to organic compounds.

Historically, salt is a subtype of ionic compound. The term salt used to only refer to the ionic compound formed by neutralisation of an acid and a base. As the definition for acid and base expands, salt becomes synonymous with ionic compound. However, that distinction still persists in some literature.

== History of discovery ==
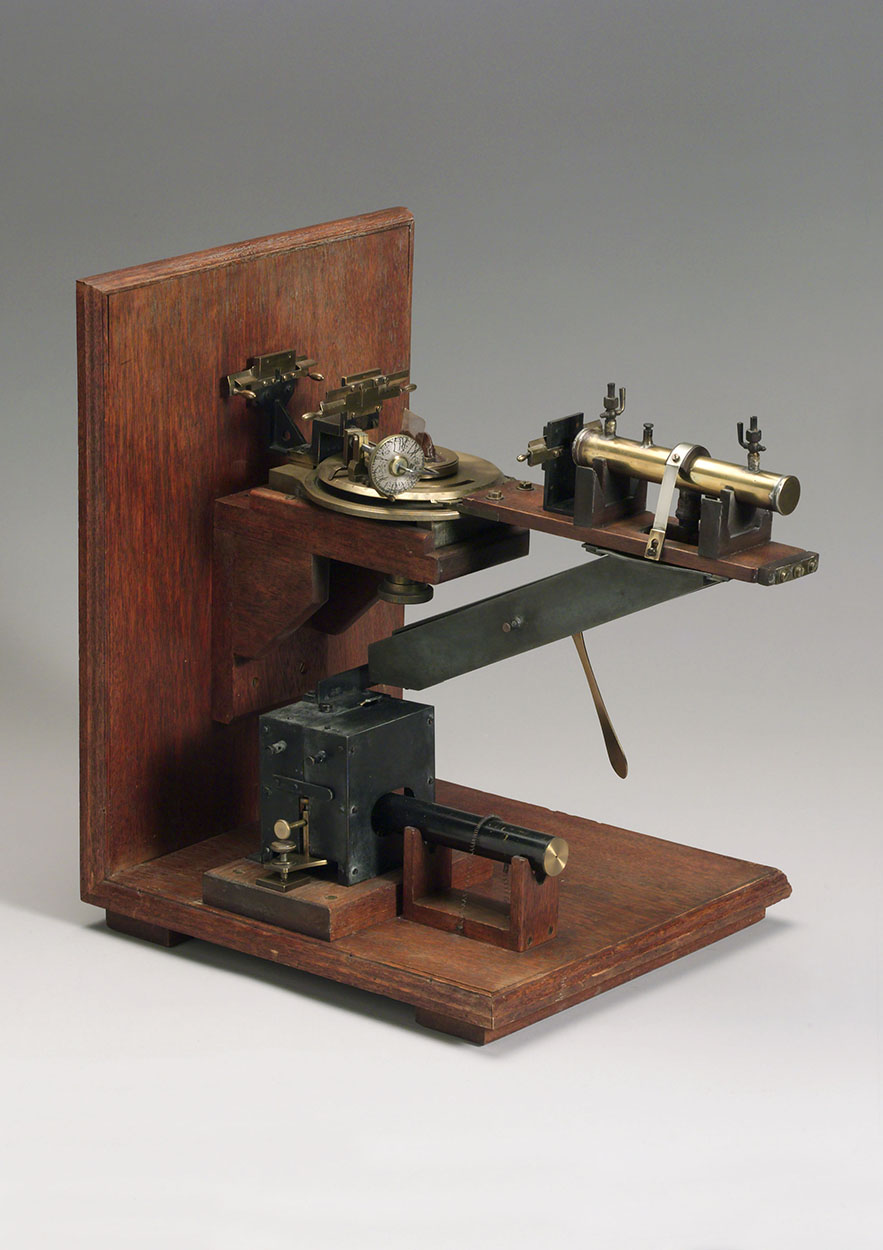
X-ray spectrometer developed by W. H. Bragg

In 1913 the structure of sodium chloride was determined by William Henry Bragg and his son William Lawrence Bragg. This revealed that there were six equidistant nearest neighbours for each atom, demonstrating that the constituents were not arranged in molecules or finite aggregates, but instead as a network with long-range crystalline order. Many other inorganic compounds were also found to have similar structural features. These compounds were soon described as being constituted of ions rather than neutral atoms, but proof of this hypothesis was not found until the mid-1920s, when X-ray reflection experiments (which detect the density of electrons), were performed.

Principal contributors to the development of a theoretical treatment of ionic crystal structures were Max Born, Fritz Haber, Alfred Landé, Erwin Madelung, Paul Peter Ewald, and Kazimierz Fajans. Born predicted crystal energies based on the assumption of ionic constituents, which showed good correspondence to thermochemical measurements, further supporting the assumption.

== Formation ==
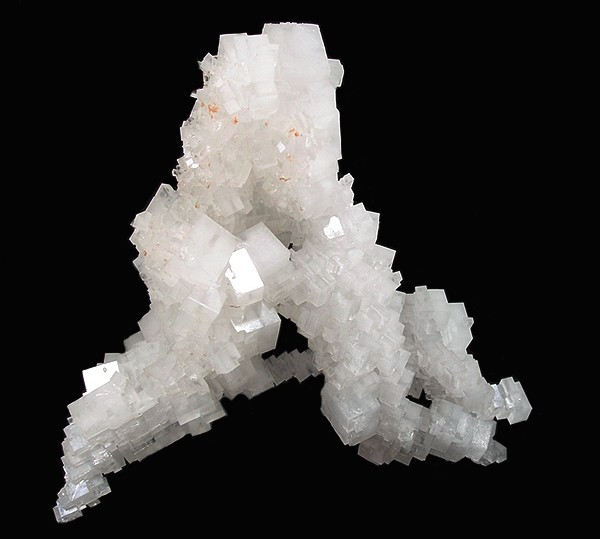
Halite, the mineral form of sodium chloride, forms when salty water evaporates leaving the ions behind.

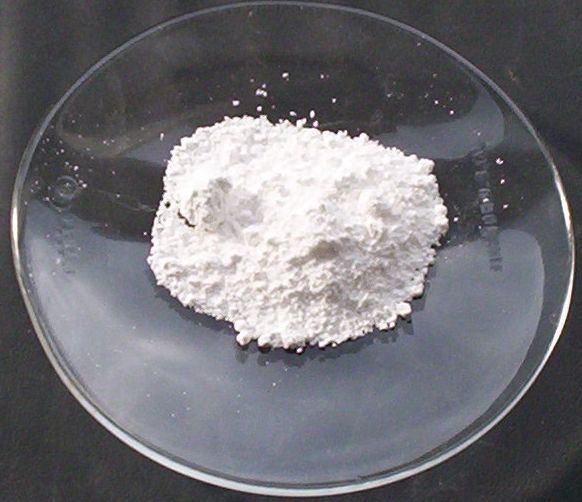
Solid lead(II) sulfate (PbSO_{4})

Many metals such as the alkali metals react directly with the electronegative halogens gases to form salts.

Solid salts can form upon evaporation of solvent from their solutions once the solution is supersaturated and the solid compound nucleates. This process occurs widely in nature and is the means of formation of the evaporite minerals.

Insoluble salts can be precipitated by mixing two solutions, one containing the cation and one containing the anion. Because all solutions are electrically neutral, the two solutions mixed must also contain counterions of the opposite charges. To ensure that these do not contaminate the precipitated salt, it is important to ensure they do not also precipitate. If the two solutions have hydrogen ions and hydroxide ions as the counterions, they will react with one another in what is called an acid–base reaction or a neutralization reaction to form water. Alternately the counterions can be chosen to ensure that even when combined into a single solution they will remain soluble as spectator ions.

If the solvent is water in either the evaporation or precipitation method of formation, in many cases the ionic crystal formed also includes water of crystallization, so the product is known as a hydrate, and can have very different chemical properties compared to the anhydrous material.

Molten salts will solidify on cooling to below their freezing point. This is sometimes used for the solid-state synthesis of complex salts from solid reactants, which are first melted together. In other cases, the solid reactants do not need to be melted, but instead can react through a solid-state reaction route. In this method, the reactants are repeatedly finely ground into a paste and then heated to a temperature where the ions in neighboring reactants can diffuse together during the time the reactant mixture remains in the oven. Other synthetic routes use a solid precursor with the correct stoichiometric ratio of non-volatile ions, which is heated to drive off other species.

In some reactions between highly reactive metals (usually from Group 1 or Group 2) and highly electronegative halogen gases, or water, the atoms can be ionized by electron transfer, a process thermodynamically understood using the Born–Haber cycle.

Salts can be formed through a variety of reaction types, such as those between:

- A base and an acid, e.g., NaOH + HCl → NaCl + H_{2}O
- A metal and an acid, e.g., Mg + H_{2}SO_{4} → MgSO_{4} + H_{2}
- A metal and a non-metal, e.g., Ca + Cl_{2} → CaCl_{2}
- A base and an acid anhydride, e.g., 2 NaOH + Cl_{2}O → 2 NaClO + H_{2}O
- An acid and a base anhydride, e.g., 2 HNO_{3} + Na_{2}O → 2 NaNO_{3} + H_{2}O
- An acid anhydride and a base anhydride, e.g., CO_{2} + Na_{2}O → Na_{2}CO_{3}
- In the salt metathesis reaction where two different salts are mixed in water, their ions recombine, and the new salt is insoluble and precipitates. For example:
  Pb(NO_{3})_{2} + Na_{2}SO_{4} → PbSO_{4}↓ + 2 NaNO_{3}

== Bonding ==
A schematic electron shell diagram of sodium and fluorine atoms undergoing a redox reaction to form sodium fluoride. Sodium loses its outer electron to give it a stable electron configuration, and this electron enters the fluorine atom exothermically. The oppositely charged ions – typically a great many of them – are then attracted to each other to form a solid.

Ions in salts are primarily held together by the electrostatic forces between the charge distribution of these bodies, and in particular, the ionic bond resulting from the long-ranged Coulomb attraction between the net negative charge of the anions and net positive charge of the cations. There is also a small additional attractive force from van der Waals interactions which contributes only around 1–2% of the cohesive energy for small ions. When a pair of ions comes close enough for their outer electron shells (most simple ions have closed shells) to overlap, a short-ranged repulsive force occurs, due to the Pauli exclusion principle. The balance between these forces leads to a potential energy well with minimum energy when the nuclei are separated by a specific equilibrium distance.

If the electronic structure of the two interacting bodies is affected by the presence of one another, covalent interactions (non-ionic) also contribute to the overall energy of the compound formed. Salts are rarely purely ionic, i.e. held together only by electrostatic forces. The bonds between even the most electronegative/electropositive pairs such as those in caesium fluoride exhibit a small degree of covalency. Conversely, covalent bonds between unlike atoms often exhibit some charge separation and can be considered to have a partial ionic character. The circumstances under which a compound will have ionic or covalent character can typically be understood using Fajans' rules, which use only charges and the sizes of each ion. According to these rules, compounds with the most ionic character will have large positive ions with a low charge, bonded to a small negative ion with a high charge. More generally HSAB theory can be applied, whereby the compounds with the most ionic character are those consisting of hard acids and hard bases: small, highly charged ions with a high difference in electronegativities between the anion and cation. This difference in electronegativities means that the charge separation, and resulting dipole moment, is maintained even when the ions are in contact (the excess electrons on the anions are not transferred or polarized to neutralize the cations).

Although chemists classify idealized bond types as being ionic or covalent, the existence of additional types such as hydrogen bonds and metallic bonds, for example, has led some philosophers of science to suggest that alternative approaches to understanding bonding are required. This could be by applying quantum mechanics to calculate binding energies.

== Structure ==
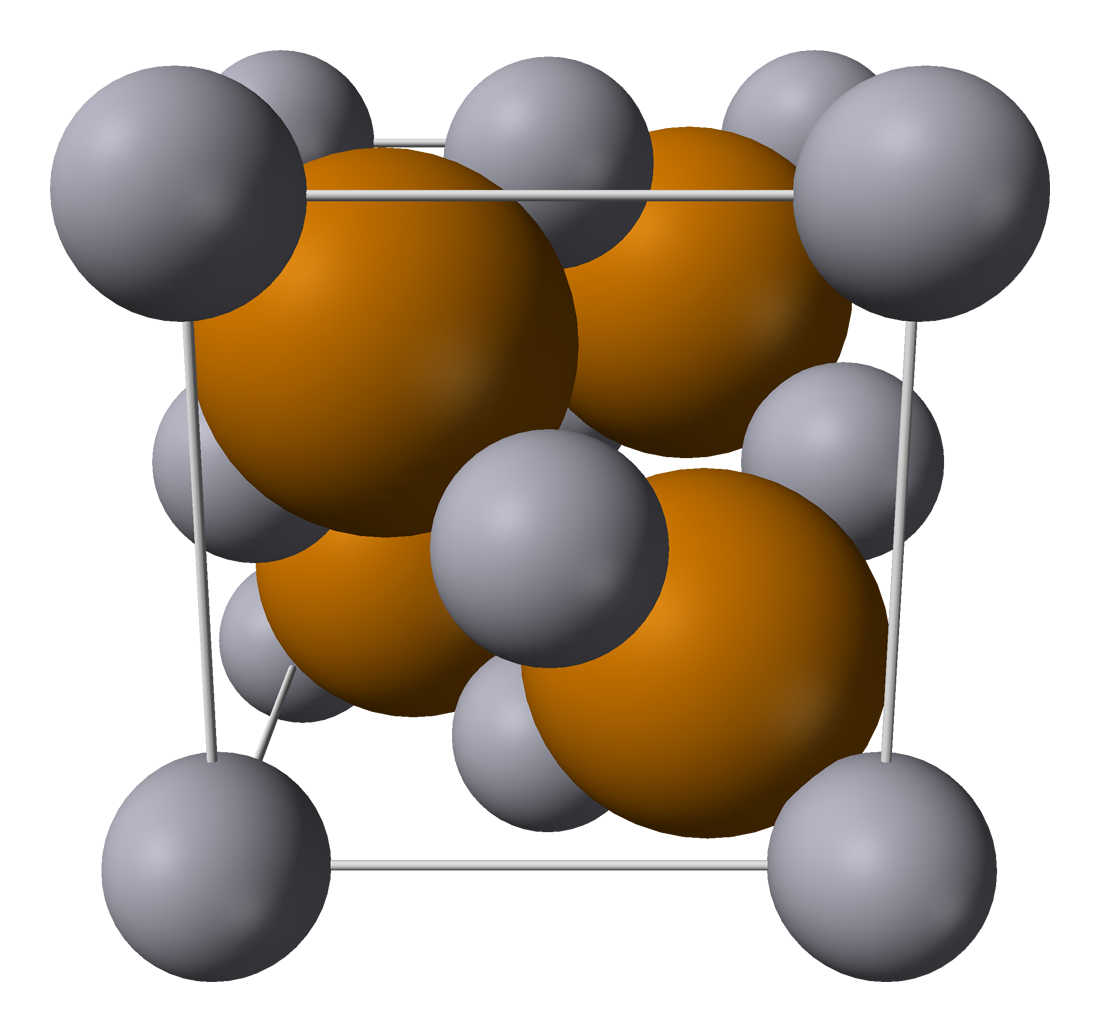
The unit cell of the zinc blende structure

The lattice energy is the summation of the interaction of all sites with all other sites. For unpolarizable spherical ions, only the charges and distances are required to determine the electrostatic interaction energy. For any particular ideal crystal structure, all distances are geometrically related to the smallest internuclear distance. So for each possible crystal structure, the total electrostatic energy can be related to the electrostatic energy of unit charges at the nearest neighboring distance by a multiplicative constant called the Madelung constant that can be efficiently computed using an Ewald sum. When a reasonable form is assumed for the additional repulsive energy, the total lattice energy can be modelled using the Born–Landé equation, the Born–Mayer equation, or in the absence of structural information, the Kapustinskii equation.

Using an even simpler approximation of the ions as impenetrable hard spheres, the arrangement of anions in these systems are often related to close-packed arrangements of spheres, with the cations occupying tetrahedral or octahedral interstices. Depending on the stoichiometry of the salt, and the coordination (principally determined by the radius ratio) of cations and anions, a variety of structures are commonly observed, and theoretically rationalized by Pauling's rules.

Common ionic compound structures with close-packed anions
Stoichiometry	Cation:anion coordination	Interstitial sites		Cubic close packing of anions		Hexagonal close packing of anions	
Stoichiometry	Cation:anion coordination	Occupancy	Critical radius ratio	Name	Madelung constant	Name	Madelung constant
MX	6:6	all octahedral	0.4142	sodium chloride	1.747565	nickeline	<1.73 (Note: This structure type has a variable lattice parameter c/a ratio, and the exact Madelung constant depends on this.)
	4:4	alternate tetrahedral	0.2247	zinc blende	1.6381	wurtzite	1.641
MX_{2}	8:4	all tetrahedral	0.2247	fluorite	5.03878		
	6:3	half octahedral (alternate layers fully occupied)	0.4142	cadmium chloride	5.61	cadmium iodide	4.71
MX_{3}	6:2	one-third octahedral	0.4142	rhodium(III) bromide (Note: This structure has been referred to in references as yttrium(III) chloride and chromium(III) chloride, but both are now known as the RhBr_{3} structure type.)	6.67 (Note: The reference lists this structure as MoCl_{3}, which is now known as the RhBr_{3} structure.)	bismuth iodide	8.26 (Note: The reference lists this structure as FeCl_{3}, which is now known as the BiI_{3} structure type.)
M_{2}X_{3}	6:4	two-thirds octahedral	0.4142			corundum	25.0312
ABO_{3}		two-thirds octahedral	0.4142			ilmenite	Depends on charges and structure (Note: This structure type can accommodate any charges on A and B that add up to six. When both are three the charge structure is equivalent to that of corrundum. The structure also has a variable lattice parameter c/a ratio, and the exact Madelung constant depends on this.)
AB_{2}O_{4}		one-eighth tetrahedral and one-half octahedral	r_{A}/r_{O} = 0.2247, r_{B}/r_{O} = 0.4142 (Note: However, in some cases such as MgAl_{2}O_{4} the larger cation occupies the smaller tetrahedral site.)	spinel, inverse spinel	Depends on cation site distributions	olivine	Depends on cation site distributions

In some cases, the anions take on a simple cubic packing and the resulting common structures observed are:

Common ionic compound structures with simple cubic packed anions
Stoichiometry	Cation:anion coordination	Interstitial sites occupied	Example structure		
Stoichiometry	Cation:anion coordination	Interstitial sites occupied	Name	Critical radius ratio	Madelung constant
MX	8:8	entirely filled	cesium chloride	0.7321	1.762675
MX_{2}	8:4	half filled	calcium fluoride		
M_{2}X	4:8	half filled	lithium oxide		

Some ionic liquids, particularly with mixtures of anions or cations, can be cooled rapidly enough that there is not enough time for crystal nucleation to occur, so an ionic glass is formed (with no long-range order).

=== Defects ===
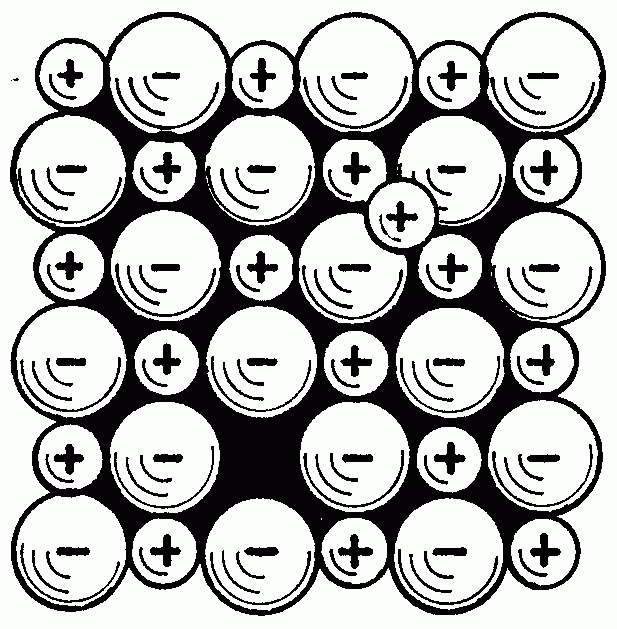
Frenkel defect

Schottky defect

Within any crystal, there will usually be some defects. To maintain electroneutrality of the crystals, defects that involve loss of a cation will be associated with loss of an anion, i.e. these defects come in pairs. Frenkel defects consist of a cation vacancy paired with a cation interstitial and can be generated anywhere in the bulk of the crystal, occurring most commonly in compounds with a low coordination number and cations that are much smaller than the anions. Schottky defects consist of one vacancy of each type, and are generated at the surfaces of a crystal, occurring most commonly in compounds with a high coordination number and when the anions and cations are of similar size. If the cations have multiple possible oxidation states, then it is possible for cation vacancies to compensate for electron deficiencies on cation sites with higher oxidation numbers, resulting in a non-stoichiometric compound. Another non-stoichiometric possibility is the formation of an F-center, a free electron occupying an anion vacancy. When the compound has three or more ionic components, even more defect types are possible. All of these point defects can be generated via thermal vibrations and have an equilibrium concentration. Because they are energetically costly but entropically beneficial, they occur in greater concentration at higher temperatures. Once generated, these pairs of defects can diffuse mostly independently of one another, by hopping between lattice sites. This defect mobility is the source of most transport phenomena within an ionic crystal, including diffusion and solid state ionic conductivity. When vacancies collide with interstitials (Frenkel), they can recombine and annihilate one another. Similarly, vacancies are removed when they reach the surface of the crystal (Schottky). Defects in the crystal structure generally expand the lattice parameters, reducing the overall density of the crystal. Defects also result in ions in distinctly different local environments, which causes them to experience a different crystal-field symmetry, especially in the case of different cations exchanging lattice sites. This results in a different splitting of d-electron orbitals, so that the optical absorption (and hence colour) can change with defect concentration.

== Properties ==
[BMIM]+[PF6]−, an ionic liquid

=== Acidity/basicity ===
Ionic compounds containing hydrogen ions (H^{+}) are classified as acids, and those containing electropositive cations and basic anions ions hydroxide (OH^{−}) or oxide (O^{2−}) are classified as bases. Other ionic compounds are known as salts and can be formed by acid–base reactions. Salts that produce hydroxide ions when dissolved in water are called alkali salts, and salts that produce hydrogen ions when dissolved in water are called acid salts, e.g. sodium hydrogen selenite (NaHSeO_{3}). If the compound is the result of a reaction between a strong acid and a weak base, the result is an acid salt. If it is the result of a reaction between a strong base and a weak acid, the result is a base salt. If it is the result of a reaction between a strong acid and a strong base, the result is a neutral salt. Weak acids reacted with weak bases can produce ionic compounds with both the conjugate base ion and conjugate acid ion, such as ammonium acetate.

Some ions are classed as amphoteric, being able to react with either an acid or a base. This is also true of some compounds with ionic character, typically oxides or hydroxides of less-electropositive metals (so the compound also has significant covalent character), such as zinc oxide, aluminium hydroxide, aluminium oxide and lead(II) oxide.

=== Solubility ===
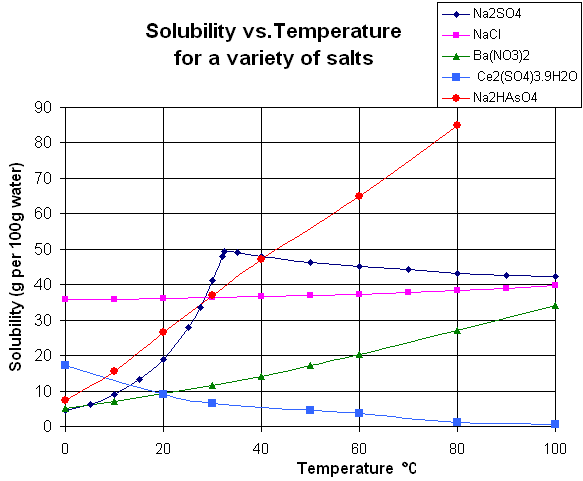
The aqueous solubility of a variety of salts as a function of temperature. Some compounds exhibiting unusual solubility behavior have been included.

When simple salts dissolve, they dissociate into individual ions, which are solvated and dispersed throughout the resulting solution. Salts do not exist in solution. In contrast, molecular compounds, which includes most organic compounds, remain intact in solution.

The solubility of salts is highest in polar solvents (such as water) or ionic liquids, but tends to be low in nonpolar solvents (such as petrol/gasoline). This contrast is principally because the resulting ion–dipole interactions are significantly stronger than ion-induced dipole interactions, so the heat of solution is higher. When the oppositely charged ions in the solid ionic lattice are surrounded by the opposite pole of a polar molecule, the solid ions are pulled out of the lattice and into the liquid. If the solvation energy exceeds the lattice energy, the negative net enthalpy change of solution provides a thermodynamic drive to remove ions from their positions in the crystal and dissolve in the liquid. The enthalpy change of solution is usually positive for most solid solutes like salts, which means that their solubility increases when the temperature increases. There are some unusual salts such as calcium hydroxide, where this enthalpy change is negative and the solubility decreases with temperature.

The lattice energy, the cohesive forces between these ions within a solid, determines the solubility. The solubility is dependent on how well each ion interacts with the solvent, so certain patterns become apparent. For example, salts of sodium, potassium and ammonium are usually soluble in water. Notable exceptions include ammonium hexachloroplatinate and potassium cobaltinitrite. Most nitrates and many sulfates are water-soluble. Exceptions include barium sulfate, calcium sulfate (sparingly soluble), and lead(II) sulfate, where the 2+/2− pairing leads to high lattice energies. For similar reasons, most metal carbonates are not soluble in water. Some soluble carbonate salts are: sodium carbonate, potassium carbonate and ammonium carbonate.

=== Strength ===
Strong salts or strong electrolyte salts are chemical salts composed of strong electrolytes. These salts dissociate completely or almost completely in water. They are generally odorless and nonvolatile. Most group 1 and 2 metals form strong salts. Strong salts are especially useful when creating conductive compounds as their constituent ions allow for greater conductivity.

Weak salts or weak electrolyte salts are composed of weak electrolytes. These salts do not dissociate well in water. They are generally more volatile than strong salts. They may be similar in odor to the acid or base they are derived from. For example, sodium acetate, CH_{3}COONa, smells similar to acetic acid CH_{3}COOH.

=== Electrical conductivity ===
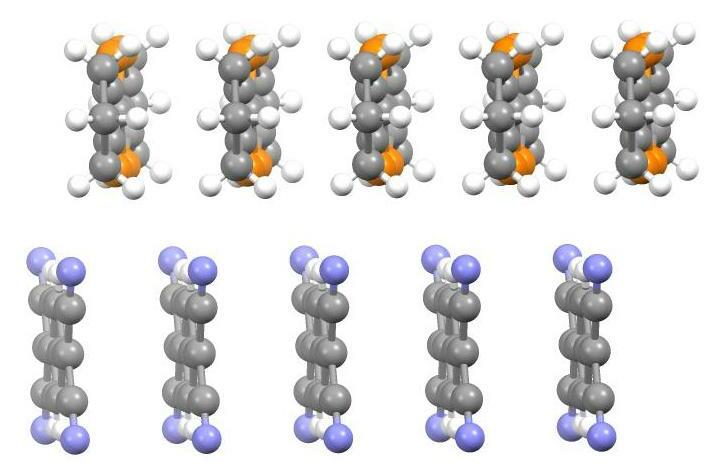
Edge-on view of portion of crystal structure of hexamethyleneTTF/TCNQ charge transfer salt.

Salts are characteristically insulators. Although they contain charged atoms or clusters, these materials do not typically conduct electricity to any significant extent when the substance is solid. In order to conduct, the charged particles must be mobile rather than stationary in a crystal lattice. This is achieved to some degree at high temperatures when the defect concentration increases the ionic mobility and solid state ionic conductivity is observed. When the salts are dissolved in a liquid or are melted into a liquid, they can conduct electricity because the ions become completely mobile. For this reason, molten salts and solutions containing dissolved salts (e.g., sodium chloride in water) can be used as electrolytes. This conductivity gain upon dissolving or melting is sometimes used as a defining characteristic of salts.

In some unusual salts: fast ion conductors, and ionic glasses, one or more of the ionic components has a significant mobility, allowing conductivity even while the material as a whole remains solid. This is often highly temperature dependent, and may be the result of either a phase change or a high defect concentration. These materials are used in all solid-state supercapacitors, batteries, and fuel cells, and in various kinds of chemical sensors.

=== Melting and boiling points ===
Electrostatic forces between particles are strongest when the charges are high, and the distance between the nuclei of the ions is small. In such cases, the compounds generally have very high melting and boiling points and a low vapour pressure. Trends in melting points can be even better explained when the structure and ionic size ratio is taken into account. Above their melting point, salts melt and become molten salts (although some salts such as aluminium chloride and iron(III) chloride show molecule-like structures in the liquid phase). Inorganic compounds with simple ions typically have small ions, and thus have high melting points, so are solids at room temperature. Some substances with larger ions, however, have a melting point below or near room temperature (often defined as up to 100 °C), and are termed ionic liquids. Ions in ionic liquids often have uneven charge distributions, or bulky substituents like hydrocarbon chains, which also play a role in determining the strength of the interactions and propensity to melt.

Even when the local structure and bonding of an ionic solid is disrupted sufficiently to melt it, there are still strong long-range electrostatic forces of attraction holding the liquid together and preventing ions boiling to form a gas phase. This means that even room temperature ionic liquids have low vapour pressures, and require substantially higher temperatures to boil. Boiling points exhibit similar trends to melting points in terms of the size of ions and strength of other interactions. When vapourized, the ions are still not freed of one another. For example, in the vapour phase sodium chloride exists as diatomic "molecules".

=== Brittleness ===
Most salts are very brittle. Once they reach the limit of their strength, they cannot deform malleably, because the strict alignment of positive and negative ions must be maintained. Instead the material undergoes fracture via cleavage. As the temperature is elevated (usually close to the melting point) a ductile–brittle transition occurs, and plastic flow becomes possible by the motion of dislocations.

=== Compressibility ===
The compressibility of a salt is strongly determined by its structure, and in particular the coordination number. For example, halides with the caesium chloride structure (coordination number 8) are less compressible than those with the sodium chloride structure (coordination number 6), and less again than those with a coordination number of 4.

=== Colour ===
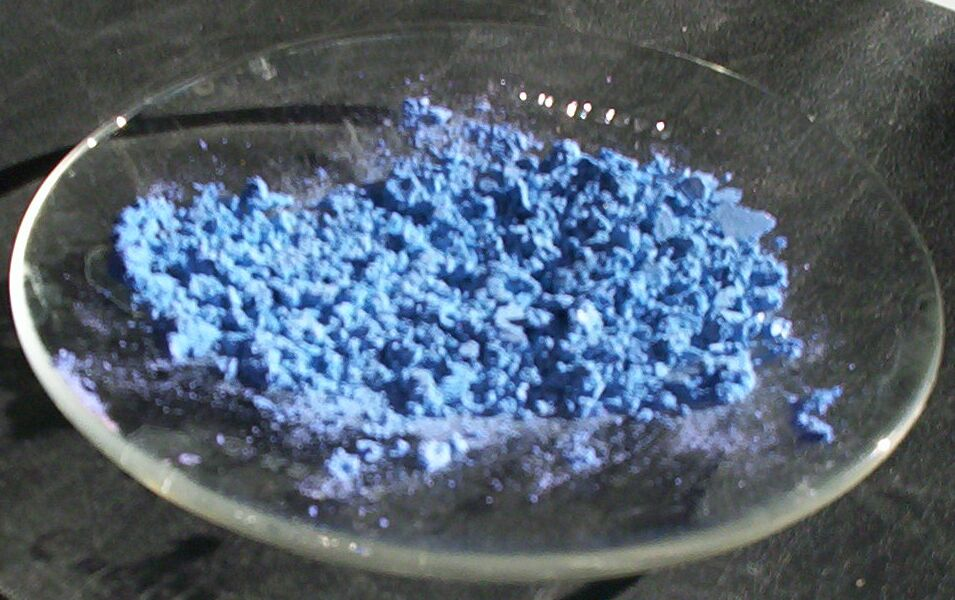
Anhydrous cobalt(II) chloride,
CoCl_{2}

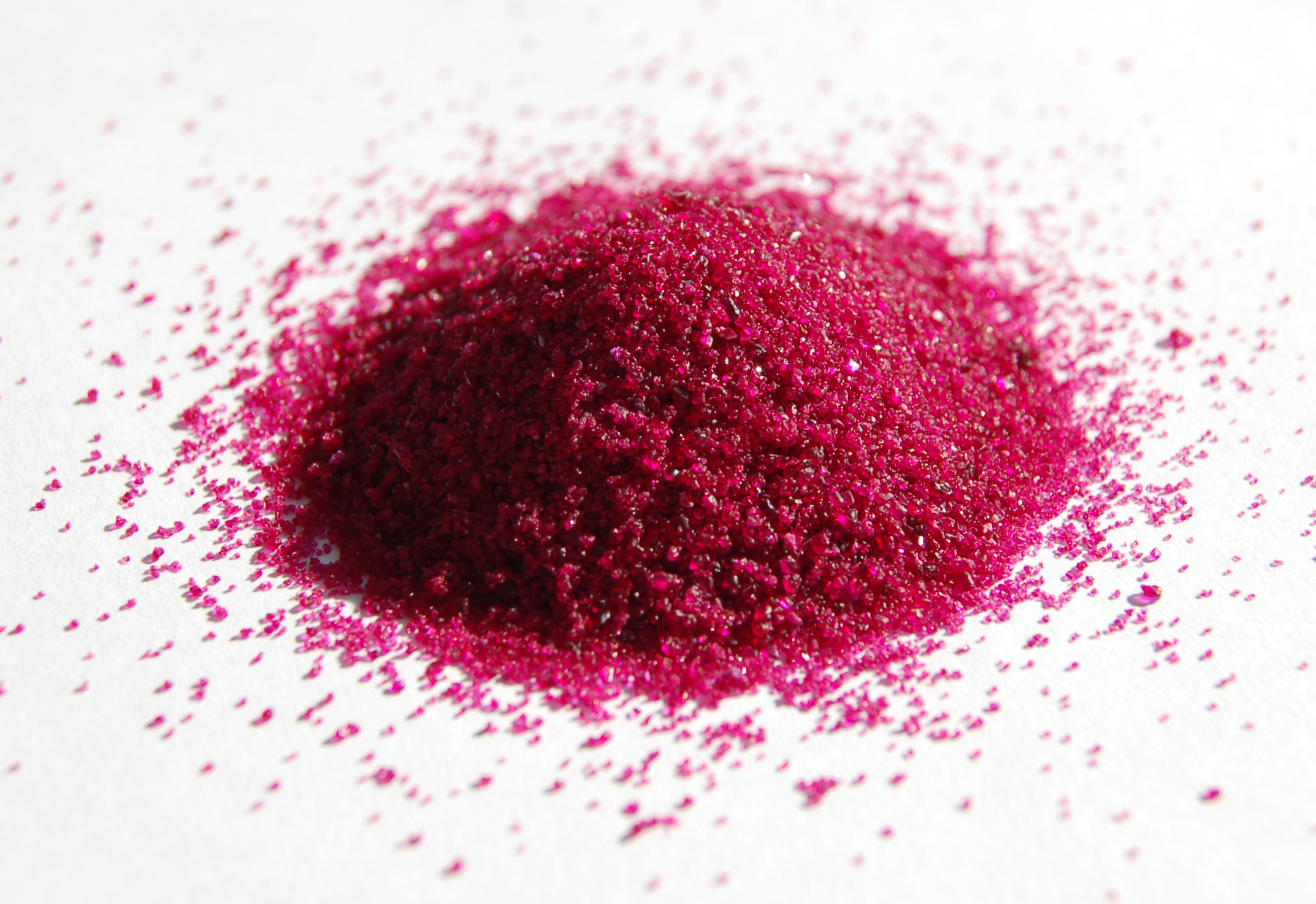
Cobalt(II) chloride hexahydrate,
CoCl_{2}·6H_{2}O

The colour of a salt is often different from the colour of an aqueous solution containing the constituent ions, or the hydrated form of the same compound.

The anions in compounds with bonds with the most ionic character tend to be colorless (with an absorption band in the ultraviolet part of the spectrum). In compounds with less ionic character, their color deepens through yellow, orange, red, and black (as the absorption band shifts to longer wavelengths into the visible spectrum).

The absorption band of simple cations shifts toward a shorter wavelength when they are involved in more covalent interactions. This occurs during hydration of metal ions, so colorless anhydrous salts with an anion absorbing in the infrared can become colorful in solution.

Salts exist in many different colors, which arise either from their constituent anions, cations or solvates. For example:

- sodium chromate Na_{2}CrO_{4} is made yellow by the chromate ion CrO^{2−}_{4}.
- potassium dichromate K_{2}Cr_{2}O_{7} is made red-orange by the dichromate ion Cr_{2}O^{2−}_{7}.
- cobalt(II) nitrate hexahydrate Co(NO_{3})_{2}·6H_{2}O is made red by the chromophore of hydrated cobalt(II) [Co(H_{2}O)_{6}]^{2+}.
- copper(II) sulfate pentahydrate CuSO_{4}·5H_{2}O is made blue by the hydrated copper(II) cation.
- potassium permanganate KMnO_{4} is made violet by the permanganate anion MnO^{−}_{4}.
- nickel(II) chloride hexahydrate NiCl_{2}·6H_{2}O is made green by the hydrated nickel(II) chloride [NiCl_{2}(H_{2}O)_{4}].
- sodium chloride NaCl and magnesium sulfate heptahydrate MgSO_{4}·7H_{2}O are colorless or white because the constituent cations and anions do not absorb light in the part of the spectrum that is visible to humans.

Some minerals are salts, some of which are soluble in water. Similarly, inorganic pigments tend not to be salts, because insolubility is required for fastness. Some organic dyes are salts, but they are virtually insoluble in water.

=== Taste ===
Salts can elicit all five basic tastes, e.g., salty (sodium chloride), sweet (lead diacetate, which will cause lead poisoning if ingested), sour (potassium bitartrate), bitter (magnesium sulfate), and umami or savory (monosodium glutamate).

=== Odor ===
Salts of strong acids and strong bases ("strong salts") are non-volatile and often odorless, whereas salts of either weak acids or weak bases ("weak salts") may smell like the conjugate acid (e.g., acetates like acetic acid (vinegar) and cyanides like hydrogen cyanide (almonds)) or the conjugate base (e.g., ammonium salts like ammonia) of the component ions. That slow, partial decomposition is usually accelerated by the presence of water, since hydrolysis is the other half of the reversible reaction equation of formation of weak salts.

== Uses ==
Salts have long had a wide variety of uses and applications. Many minerals are ionic. Humans have processed common salt (sodium chloride) for over 8000 years, using it first as a food seasoning and preservative, and now also in manufacturing, agriculture, water conditioning, for de-icing roads, and many other uses. Many salts are so widely used in society that they go by common names unrelated to their chemical identity. Examples of this include borax, calomel, milk of magnesia, muriatic acid, oil of vitriol, saltpeter, and slaked lime.

Soluble salts can easily be dissolved to provide electrolyte solutions. This is a simple way to control the concentration and ionic strength. The concentration of solutes affects many colligative properties, including increasing the osmotic pressure, and causing freezing-point depression and boiling-point elevation. Because the solutes are charged ions they also increase the electrical conductivity of the solution. The increased ionic strength reduces the thickness of the electrical double layer around colloidal particles, and therefore the stability of emulsions and suspensions.

The chemical identity of the ions added is also important in many uses. For example, fluoride containing compounds are dissolved to supply fluoride ions for water fluoridation.

Solid salts have long been used as paint pigments, and are resistant to organic solvents, but are sensitive to acidity or basicity. Since 1801 pyrotechnicians have described and widely used metal-containing salts as sources of colour in fireworks. Under intense heat, the electrons in the metal ions or small molecules can be excited. These electrons later return to lower energy states, and release light with a colour spectrum characteristic of the species present.

In chemical synthesis, salts are often used as precursors for high-temperature solid-state synthesis.

Many metals are geologically most abundant as salts within ores. To obtain the elemental materials, these ores are processed by smelting or electrolysis, in which redox reactions occur (often with a reducing agent such as carbon) such that the metal ions gain electrons to become neutral atoms.

== Nomenclature ==
According to the nomenclature recommended by IUPAC, salts are named according to their composition, not their structure. In the most simple case of a binary salt with no possible ambiguity about the charges and thus the stoichiometry, the common name is written using two words. The name of the cation (the unmodified element name for monatomic cations) comes first, followed by the name of the anion. For example, MgCl_{2} is named magnesium chloride, and Na_{2}SO_{4} is named sodium sulfate (SO^{2−}_{4}, sulfate, is an example of a polyatomic ion). To obtain the empirical formula from these names, the stoichiometry can be deduced from the charges on the ions, and the requirement of overall charge neutrality.

If there are multiple different cations and/or anions, multiplicative prefixes (di-, tri-, tetra-, ...) are often required to indicate the relative compositions, and cations then anions are listed in alphabetical order. For example, KMgCl_{3} is named magnesium potassium trichloride to distinguish it from K_{2}MgCl_{4}, magnesium dipotassium tetrachloride (note that in both the empirical formula and the written name, the cations appear in alphabetical order, but the order varies between them because the symbol for potassium is K). When one of the ions already has a multiplicative prefix within its name, the alternate multiplicative prefixes (bis-, tris-, tetrakis-, ...) are used. For example, Ba(BrF_{4})_{2} is named barium bis(tetrafluoridobromate).

Compounds containing one or more elements which can exist in a variety of charge/oxidation states will have a stoichiometry that depends on which oxidation states are present, to ensure overall neutrality. This can be indicated in the name by specifying either the oxidation state of the elements present, or the charge on the ions. Because of the risk of ambiguity in allocating oxidation states, IUPAC prefers direct indication of the ionic charge numbers. These are written as an arabic integer followed by the sign (... , 2−, 1−, 1+, 2+, ...) in parentheses directly after the name of the cation (without a space separating them). For example, FeSO_{4} is named iron(2+) sulfate (with the 2+ charge on the Fe^{2+} ions balancing the 2− charge on the sulfate ion), whereas Fe_{2}(SO_{4})_{3} is named iron(3+) sulfate (because the two iron ions in each formula unit each have a charge of 3+, to balance the 2− on each of the three sulfate ions). Stock nomenclature, still in common use, writes the oxidation number in Roman numerals (... , −II, −I, 0, I, II, ...). So the examples given above would be named iron(II) sulfate and iron(III) sulfate respectively. For simple ions the ionic charge and the oxidation number are identical, but for polyatomic ions they often differ. For example, the uranyl(2+) ion, UO^{2+}_{2}, has uranium in an oxidation state of +6, so would be called a dioxouranium(VI) ion in Stock nomenclature. An even older naming system for metal cations, also still widely used, appended the suffixes -ous and -ic to the Latin root of the name, to give special names for the low and high oxidation states. For example, this scheme uses "ferrous" and "ferric", for iron(II) and iron(III) respectively, so the examples given above were classically named ferrous sulfate and ferric sulfate.

Common salt-forming cations include:

- Ammonium NH^{+}_{4}
- Calcium Ca^{2+}
- Iron Fe^{2+} and Fe^{3+}
- Magnesium Mg^{2+}
- Potassium K^{+}
- Pyridinium C_{5}H_{5}NH^{+}
- Quaternary ammonium NR^{+}_{4}, R being an alkyl group or an aryl group
- Sodium Na^{+}
- Copper Cu^{2+}

Common salt-forming anions (parent acids in parentheses where available) include:

- Acetate CH_{3}COO^{−} (acetic acid)
- Carbonate CO^{2−}_{3} (carbonic acid)
- Chloride Cl^{−} (hydrochloric acid)
- Citrate HOC(COO^{−})(CH_{2}COO^{−})_{2} (citric acid)
- Cyanide C≡N^{−} (hydrocyanic acid)
- Fluoride F^{−} (hydrofluoric acid)
- Nitrate NO^{−}_{3} (nitric acid)
- Nitrite NO^{−}_{2} (nitrous acid)
- Oxide O^{2−} (water)
- Phosphate PO^{3−}_{4} (phosphoric acid)
- Sulfate SO^{2−}_{4} (sulfuric acid)

Salts with varying number of hydrogen atoms replaced by cations as compared to their parent acid can be referred to as monobasic, dibasic, or tribasic, identifying that one, two, or three hydrogen atoms have been replaced; polybasic salts refer to those with more than one hydrogen atom replaced. Examples include:

- Sodium phosphate monobasic (NaH_{2}PO_{4})
- Sodium phosphate dibasic (Na_{2}HPO_{4})
- Sodium phosphate tribasic (Na_{3}PO_{4})

== Non-salt ==
=== Zwitterion ===
Zwitterions contain an anionic and a cationic centre in the same molecule, but are not considered salts. Examples of zwitterions are amino acids, many metabolites, peptides, and proteins.

== See also ==
- Bonding in solids
- Bresle method (the method used to test for salt presence during coating applications)
- Carboxylate
- Halide
- Ioliomics
- Ionic bonds
- Natron
- Salinity
- Salt metathesis reaction
