= Ioliomics =

Study of ions in liquids and liquid phases

Ioliomics (from a portmanteau of ions and liquids) is the study of ions in liquids (or liquid phases) and stipulated with fundamental differences of ionic interactions. Ioliomics covers a broad research area concerning structure, properties and applications of ions involved in various biological and chemical systems. The concept of this research discipline is related to other comprehensive research fields, such as genomics, proteomics, glycomics, petroleomics, etc., where the suffix -omics is used for describing the comprehensiveness of data.

== Fundamental nature ==
The nature of chemical reactions and their description is one of the most fundamental problems in chemistry. The concepts of covalent and ionic bonds which emerged in the beginning of the 20th century specify the profound differences between their electronic structures. These differences, in turn, lead to dramatically different behavior of covalent and ionic compounds both in the solution and solid phase. In the solid phase, ionic compounds, e.g. salts, are prone to formation of crystal lattices; in polar solvents, they dissociate into ions surrounded by solvate shells, thus rendering the solution highly ionic conductive. In contrast to covalent bonds, ionic interactions demonstrate flexible, dynamic behavior, which allows tuning ionic compounds to obtain desired properties.

== Importance ==
Ionic compounds interact strongly with the solvent medium; therefore, their impact on chemical and biochemical processes involving ions can be significant. Even in the case of simplest ions and solvents, the presence of the former can lead to rearrangement and restructuring of the latter. It is established that ionic reactions are involved in numerous phenomena at the scales of whole galaxies or single living cells. To name a few, in living cells, metal ions bind to metalloenzymes and other proteins therefore modulating their activity; ions are involved in the control of neuronal functioning during sleep – wakefulness cycles; anomalous activity of ion channels results in the development of various disorders, such as Parkinson's and Alzheimer's diseases, etc. Thus, despite the problems associated with the studies on properties and activities of ions in various chemical and biological systems, this research field is among the most urgent ones.

== Ion-abundant liquid media ==
Of special interest are ion-abundant liquid media (such as ionic liquids, molten salts, liquid electrolytes, etc.), which represent “liquid ions” with excellent tunable properties for different applications. The systems are famous for their ability to solvent-solute self-organization phenomena and are often employed in chemistry, biochemistry and pharmaceutical research. One of the most important features of ion-abundant liquid media is their huge potential to be fine-tuned. Thus, one can design an ionic liquid with virtually any combination of physicochemical or biochemical properties. Research in the area of “liquid ions” is a rapidly developing scientific field, and numerous data on their properties and activities have been accumulated so far. Currently, the concept finds applications in catalysis, electrochemistry, analytics, fuel production, biomass processing, biotechnology, biochemistry and pharmaceutics.
