= Born–Landé equation =

Formula for lattice energy

The Born–Landé equation is a means of calculating the lattice energy of a crystalline ionic compound. In 1918 Max Born and Alfred Landé proposed that the lattice energy could be derived from the electrostatic potential of the ionic lattice and a repulsive potential energy term.

$$U_{lat}  =- \frac{N_AMz^+z^- e^2 }{4 \pi \varepsilon_0 r_0}\left(1-\frac{1}{n}\right)$$

Where:

- U_{lat} = the lattice energy
- N_{A} ≈ 6.0221×10^{23} mol^{−1}. = Avogadro constant
- M = Madelung constant, relating to the geometry of the crystal
- z^{+} = numeric charge number of cation
- z^{−} = numeric charge number of anion
- e = elementary charge, 1.6022×10^{−19} C
- ε_{0} ≈ 8.8542×10^{−12} F⋅m^{−1}. = permittivity of free space
- 4πε_{0} = 1.112×10^{−10} C^{2}/(J·m)
- r_{0} = distance between closest cation [ +ve ] and anion [ -ve ]
- n = Born exponent, typically a number between 5 and 12, determined experimentally by measuring the compressibility of the solid, or derived theoretically

== Derivation ==
The ionic lattice is modeled as an assembly of hard elastic spheres which are compressed together by the mutual attraction of the electrostatic charges on the ions. They achieve the observed equilibrium distance apart due to a balancing short range repulsion.

=== Electrostatic potential ===
The electrostatic potential energy, E_{pair}, between a pair of ions of equal and opposite charge is:

$$E_\text{pair} = -\frac{z^2 e^2 }{4 \pi \epsilon_0 r}$$

where

z = magnitude of charge on one ion
e = elementary charge, 1.6022×10^{−19} C
ε_{0} = permittivity of free space

4πε_{0} = 1.112×10^{−10} C^{2}/(J·m)

r = distance separating the ion centers

For a simple lattice consisting ions with equal and opposite charge in a 1:1 ratio, interactions between one ion and all other lattice ions need to be summed to calculate E_{M}, sometimes called the Madelung or lattice energy:

$$E_\text{M} = -\frac{z^2 e^2 M}{4 \pi \epsilon_0 r}$$

where

M = Madelung constant, which is related to the geometry of the crystal
r = closest distance between two ions of opposite charge

=== Repulsive term ===
Born and Lande suggested that a repulsive interaction between the lattice ions would be proportional to 1/r^{n} so that the repulsive energy term, E_{R}, would be expressed:

$$E_\text{R} = \frac{B}{r^n}$$

where

B = constant scaling the strength of the repulsive interaction
r = closest distance between two ions of opposite charge
n = Born exponent, a number between 5 and 12 expressing the steepness of the repulsive barrier

=== Total energy ===
The total intensive potential energy of an ion in the lattice can therefore be expressed as the sum of the Madelung and repulsive potentials:

$$E(r) = -\frac{z^2 e^2 M}{4 \pi \epsilon_0 r} + \frac{B}{r^n}$$

Minimizing this energy with respect to r yields the equilibrium separation r_{0} in terms of the unknown constant B:

$$\begin{align}
\frac{\mathrm{d}E}{\mathrm{d}r} &= \frac{z^2 e^2 M}{4 \pi \epsilon_0 r^2} - \frac{n B}{r^{n+1}} \\
0 &= \frac{z^2 e^2 M}{4 \pi \epsilon_0 r_0^2} - \frac{n B}{r_0^{n+1}} \\
r_0 &= \left( \frac{4 \pi \epsilon_0 n B}{z^2 e^2 M}\right) ^\frac{1}{n-1} \\
B &= \frac{z^2 e^2 M}{4 \pi \epsilon_0 n} r_0^{n-1}
\end{align}$$

Evaluating the minimum intensive potential energy and substituting the expression for B in terms of r_{0} yields the Born–Landé equation:

$$E(r_0) = - \frac{M z^2 e^2 }{4 \pi \epsilon_0 r_0}\left(1-\frac{1}{n}\right)$$

== Calculated lattice energies ==
The Born–Landé equation gives an idea to the lattice energy of a system.

Compound	Calculated	Experimental
NaCl	−756 kJ/mol	−787 kJ/mol
LiF	−1007 kJ/mol	−1046 kJ/mol
CaCl_{2}	−2170 kJ/mol	−2255 kJ/mol

== Born exponent ==
The Born exponent is typically between 5 and 12. Approximate experimental values are listed below:

Ion configuration	He	Ne	Ar, Cu^{+}	Kr, Ag^{+}	Xe, Au^{+}
n	5	7	9	10	12

== See also ==
- Kapustinskii equation
- Born–Mayer equation
