= Color of chemicals =

Physical property of chemicals

The color of chemicals is a physical property of chemicals that in most cases comes from the excitation of electrons due to an absorption of energy performed by the chemical.

The study of chemical structure by means of energy absorption and release is generally referred to as spectroscopy.

== Theory ==
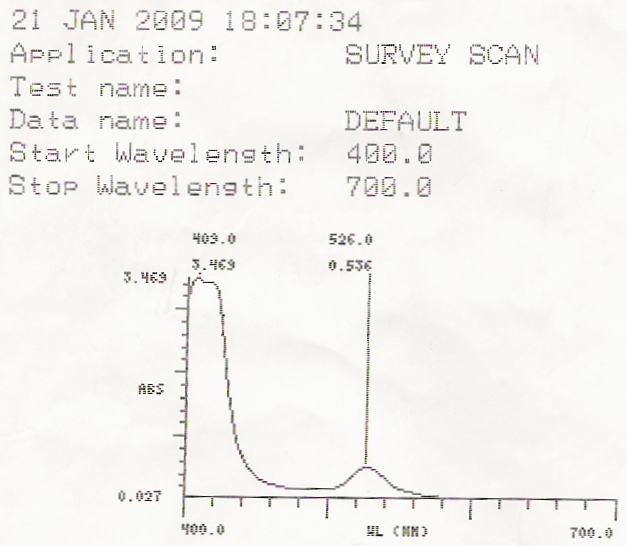
The UV-vis spectrum for a compound that appears orange in Dimethylformamide

All atoms and molecules are capable of absorbing and releasing energy in the form of photons, accompanied by a change of quantum state. The amount of energy absorbed or released is the difference between the energies of the two quantum states. There are various types of quantum state, including, for example, the rotational and vibrational states of a molecule. However the release of energy visible to the human eye, commonly referred to as visible light, spans the wavelengths approximately 380 nm to 760 nm, depending on the individual, and photons in this range usually accompany a change in atomic or molecular orbital quantum state. The perception of light is governed by three types of color receptors in the eye, which are sensitive to different ranges of wavelength within this band.

The relationship between energy and wavelength is determined by the Planck-Einstein relation

$$E = hf = \frac{hc}{\lambda}$$

where E is the energy of the quantum (photon), f is the frequency of the light wave, h is the Planck constant, λ is the wavelength and c is the speed of light.

The relationships between the energies of the various quantum states are treated by atomic orbital, molecular orbital, Ligand Field Theory and Crystal Field Theory. If photons of a particular wavelength are absorbed by matter, then when we observe light reflected from or transmitted through that matter, what we see is the complementary color, made up of the other visible wavelengths remaining. For example, beta-carotene has maximum absorption at 454 nm (blue light), consequently what visible light remains appears orange .

== Colors by wavelength ==
What is seen by the eye is not the color absorbed, but the complementary color from the removal of the absorbed wavelengths. This spectral perspective was first noted in atomic spectroscopy.

Below is a rough table of wavelengths, colors and complementary colors. This utilizes the scientific CMY and RGB color wheels rather than the traditional RYB color wheel.

Wavelength (nm)	Color	Complementary color
400–424	violet	yellow
424–491	blue	orange
491–570	green	red
570–585	yellow	violet
585–647	orange	blue
647–700	red	green

This can only be used as a very rough guide, for instance if a narrow range of wavelengths within the band 647–700 nm is absorbed, then the blue and green receptors will be fully stimulated, making cyan, and the red receptor will be partially stimulated, diluting the cyan to a greyish hue.

== By category ==
The vast majority of simple inorganic (e.g. sodium chloride) and organic compounds (e.g. ethanol) are colorless. Transition metal compounds are often colored because of transitions of electrons between d-orbitals of different energy. (see Transition metal#Colored compounds). Organic compounds tend to be colored when there is extensive conjugation, causing the energy gap between the HOMO and LUMO to decrease, bringing the absorption band from the UV to the visible region. Similarly, color is due to the energy absorbed by the compound, when an electron transitions from the HOMO to the LUMO. Lycopene is a classic example of a compound with extensive conjugation (11 conjugated double bonds), giving rise to an intense red color (lycopene is responsible for the color of tomatoes). Charge-transfer complexes tend to have very intense colors for different reasons.

== Examples ==
Colors of metallic ions
Name	Formula	Color
Magnesium(II)	Mg^{2+}	colorless
Scandium(III)	Sc^{3+}	silver
Titanium(III)	Ti^{3+}	purple
Titanium(IV)	Ti^{4+}	silver
Titanyl	TiO^{2+}	colorless
Vanadium(II)	V^{2+}	light purple
Vanadium(III)	V^{3+}	dark grey-green
Vanadyl(IV)	VO^{2+}	blue
Vanadium(IV) (vanadite)	V_{4}O^{2−}_{9}	brown
Vanadium(V) (pervanadyl)	VO^{+}_{2}	yellow
Metavanadate	VO^{−}_{3}	colorless
Orthovanadate	VO^{3−}_{4}	colorless
Chromium(II)	Cr^{2+}	bright blue
Chromium(III)	Cr^{3+}	blue-green-grey
Chromium(III) hydroxide	Cr(OH)_{6}^{3−}	yellowish
Monochromate	CrO^{2−}_{4}	yellow
Dichromate	Cr_{2}O^{2−}_{7}	orange
Manganese(II)	Mn^{2+}	pale pink
Manganese(III)	Mn^{3+}	crimson
Manganate(V)	MnO^{3−}_{4}	deep blue
Manganate(VI)	MnO^{2−}_{4}	dark green
Manganate(VII) (permanganate)	MnO^{−}_{4}	deep purple
Iron(II)	Fe^{2+}	greenish
Cobalt(II) fluoride	Co^{2+}	pink
Cobalt(III) amine	Co(NH_{3})^{3+}_{6}	yellow/orange
Nickel(II)	Ni^{2+}	light green
Nickel(II) amine complex	Ni(NH_{3})^{2+}_{6}	lavender/blue
Copper(I) amine complex	Cu(NH_{3})^{+}_{2}	colorless
Copper(II)	Cu^{2+}	blue
Copper(II) amine complex	Cu(NH_{3})^{2+}_{4}	indigo-blue
Copper(II) chloride	CuCl^{2−}_{4}	blue-green
Zinc(II)	Zn^{2+}	colorless
Silver(I)	Ag^{+}	colorless
Silver(III) in conc. HNO_{3}	Ag^{3+}	dark brown

However, elemental colors will vary depending on what they are complexed with, often as well as their chemical state. An example with vanadium(III); VCl_{3} has a distinctive reddish hue, whilst V_{2}O_{3} appears black.

=== Salts ===
Predicting the color of a compound can be extremely complicated. Some examples include:

- Cobalt chloride is pink or blue depending on the state of hydration (blue dry, pink with water) so it is used as a moisture indicator in silica gel.
- Zinc oxide is white, but at higher temperatures becomes yellow, returning to white as it cools.

Colors of various salts
Name	Formula of the corresponding salts	Color	Picture
Iron(III) chloride hexahydrate	FeCl_{3}·6H_{2}O	yellow/brown	Iron(III) chloride hexahydrate
Iron(III) chloride anhydrate	FeCl_{3}	black	Iron(III) chloride anhydrate
Chromium (III) sulfate	Cr_{2}(SO_{4})_{3}	dark green	Chromium(III) sulfate
Copper(II) sulfate anhydrate	CuSO_{4}	white	Anhydrous copper(II) sulfate
Copper(II) sulfate pentahydrate	CuSO_{4}·5H_{2}O	blue	Large crystals of copper sulfate
Copper(II) benzoate	Cu(C_{7}H_{5}O_{2})_{2}	blue	Powdered copper benzoate
Cobalt(II) chloride	CoCl_{2}	dep blue	Cobalt(II) chloride
Cobalt(II) chloride hexahydrate	CoCl_{2}·6H_{2}O	deep magenta	Cobalt(II) chloride hexahydrate
Manganese(II) chloride tetrahydrate	MnCl_{2}·4H_{2}O	pink	Manganese(II) chloride tetrahydrate
Copper(II) chloride dihydrate	CuCl_{2}·2H_{2}O	blue-green	copper(II) chloride dihydrate
Nickel(II) chloride hexahydrate	NiCl_{2}·6H_{2}O	green	Nickel(II) chloride hexahydrate
Lead(II) iodide	PbI_{2}	yellow	Lead(II) iodide
Ammonium dichromate	(NH_{4})_{2}Cr_{2}O_{7}	orange	Ammonium dichromate

=== Ions in flame ===
Colors of metal ions in flame
Name	Formula	Color
Lithium	Li	red
Sodium	Na	yellow/orange
Magnesium	Mg	brilliant white
Potassium	K	lilac/violet
Calcium	Ca	brick red
Rubidium	Rb	red-violet
Strontium	Sr	red
Caesium	Cs	light blue
Barium	Ba	green/yellow
Copper	Cu	Blue/Green(Often with white flashes)
Lead	Pb	Grey/White

=== Gases ===
Colors of various gases
Name	Formula	Color
Hydrogen	H_{2}	colorless
Oxygen	O_{2}	pale blue
Ozone	O_{3}	pale blue
Fluorine	F_{2}	pale yellow
Chlorine	Cl_{2}	greenish yellow
Bromine	Br_{2}	red/brown
Iodine	I_{2}	dark purple
Chlorine dioxide	ClO_{2}	intense yellow
Dichlorine monoxide	Cl_{2}O	brown/yellow
Nitrogen dioxide	NO_{2}	dark brown
Trifluoronitrosomethane	CF_{3}NO	deep blue
Diazomethane	CH_{2}N_{2}	yellow

==== Bead tests ====
A variety of colors, often similar to the colors found in a flame test, are produced in a bead test, which is a qualitative test for determining metals. A platinum loop is moistened and dipped in a fine powder of the substance in question and borax. The loop with the adhered powders is then heated in a flame until it fuses and the color of the resulting bead observed.

Colors exhibited by metals in the bead test
Metal	Oxidizing flame	Reducing flame
Aluminium	colorless (hot and cold), opaque	colorless, opaque
Antimony	colorless, yellow or brown (hot)	gray and opaque
Barium	colorless	
Bismuth	colorless, yellow or brownish (hot)	gray and opaque
Cadmium	colorless	gray and opaque
Calcium	colorless	
Cerium	red (hot)	colorless (hot and cold)
Chromium	dark yellow (hot), green (cold)	green (hot and cold)
Cobalt	blue (hot and cold)	blue (hot and cold)
Copper	green (hot), blue (cold)	red, opaque (cold), colorless (hot)
Gold	golden (hot), silver (cold)	red (hot and cold)
Iron	yellow or brownish red (hot and cold)	green (hot and cold)
Lead	colorless, yellow or brownish (hot)	gray and opaque
Magnesium	colorless	
Manganese	violet (hot and cold)	colorless (hot and cold)
Molybdenum	colorless	yellow or brown (hot)
Nickel	brown, red (cold)	gray and opaque (cold)
Silicon	colorless (hot and cold), opaque	colorless, opaque
Silver	colorless	gray and opaque
Strontium	colorless	
Tin	colorless (hot and cold), opaque	colorless, opaque
Titanium	colorless	yellow (hot), violet (cold)
Tungsten	colorless	brown
Uranium	yellow or brownish (hot)	green
Vanadium	colorless	green
