= Lattice energy =

Energy change upon the formation of one mole of ionic solid

In chemistry, the lattice energy is the energy change (released) upon formation of one mole of a crystalline compound from its infinitely separated constituents, which are assumed to initially be in the gaseous state at 0 K (−273.15 °C). It is a measure of the cohesive forces that bind crystalline solids. The size of the lattice energy is connected to many other physical properties including solubility, hardness, and volatility. Since it generally cannot be measured directly, the lattice energy is usually deduced from experimental data via the Born–Haber cycle.

== Lattice energy and lattice enthalpy ==
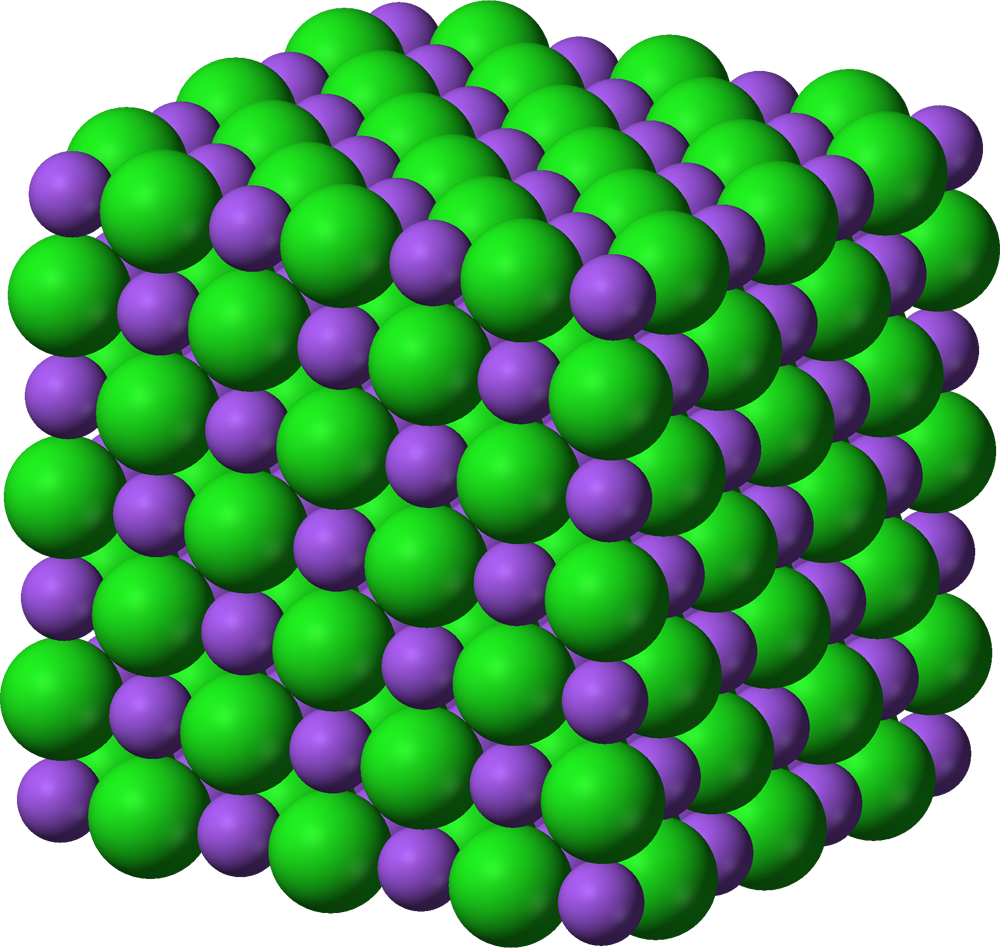
Sodium chloride crystal lattice

The concept of lattice energy was originally applied to the formation of compounds with structures like rocksalt (NaCl) and sphalerite (ZnS) where the ions occupy high-symmetry crystal lattice sites. In the case of NaCl, lattice energy is the energy change of the reaction:

Na^{+}(g) + Cl^{−}(g) → NaCl(s)

which amounts to −786 kJ/mol.

Some chemistry textbooks as well as the widely used CRC Handbook of Chemistry and Physics define lattice energy with the opposite sign, i.e. as the energy required to convert the crystal into infinitely separated gaseous ions in vacuum, an endothermic process. Following this convention, the lattice energy of NaCl would be +786 kJ/mol. Both sign conventions are widely used.

The relationship between the lattice energy Δ_{lat}U and the lattice enthalpy Δ_{lat}H at pressure p is given by the following equation:

Δ_{lat}U = Δ_{lat}H -pΔV_{m}

where Δ_{lat}U is the lattice energy (i.e., the molar internal energy change), Δ_{lat}H is the lattice enthalpy, and ΔV_{m} the change of molar volume due to the formation of the lattice. Since the molar volume of the solid is much smaller than that of the gases, ΔV_{m} < 0. The formation of a crystal lattice from ions in vacuum must lower the internal energy due to the net attractive forces involved, and so Δ_{lat}U < 0. The -pΔV_{m} term is positive but is relatively small at low pressures, and so the value of the lattice enthalpy is also negative (and exothermic). Both lattice energy and lattice enthalpy are identical at 0 K and the difference may be disregarded in practice at normal temperatures.

== Theoretical treatments ==
=== Lattice energy of ionic compounds ===
The lattice energy of an ionic compound depends strongly upon the charges of the ions that comprise the solid, which must attract or repel one another via Coulomb's law. More subtly, the relative and absolute sizes of the ions influence Δ_{lat}H. London dispersion forces also exist between ions and contribute to the lattice energy via polarization effects. For ionic compounds made up of molecular cations and/or anions, there may also be ion-dipole and dipole-dipole interactions if either molecule has a molecular dipole moment. The theoretical treatments described below are focused on compounds made of atomic cations and anions, and neglect contributions to the internal energy of the lattice from thermalized lattice vibrations.

=== Born–Landé equation ===
In 1918 Max Born and Alfred Landé proposed that the lattice energy could be derived from the electric potential of the ionic lattice and a repulsive potential energy term. This equation estimates the lattice energy based on electrostatic interactions and a repulsive term characterized by a power-law dependence (using a Born exponent, $n$). It was published building on earlier work by Born on ionic lattices.

$$\Delta _{lat}U = -\frac{N_AMz^+z^- e^2 }{4 \pi \varepsilon_0 r_0}\left(1-\frac{1}{n}\right)$$

where $N_A$ is the Avogadro constant, $M$ is the Madelung constant, $z^+$/$z^-$ are the charge numbers of the cations and anions, $e$ is the elementary charge (1.6022×10^{−19} C), $\varepsilon_0$ is the permittivity of free space ($4 \pi \varepsilon_0$ = 1.112×10^{−10} C^{2}/(J·m)), $r_0$ is the distance to the closest ion (nearest neighbour) and $n$ is the Born exponent (a number between 5 and 12, determined experimentally by measuring the compressibility of the solid, or derived theoretically).

The Born–Landé equation above shows that the lattice energy of a compound depends principally on two factors:

- as the charges on the ions increase, the lattice energy increases (becomes more negative)
- when the ions are closer together, the lattice energy increases (becomes more negative)

Barium oxide (BaO), for instance, which has the NaCl structure and therefore the same Madelung constant, has a bond radius of 275 picometers and a lattice energy of −3054 kJ/mol, while sodium chloride (NaCl) has a bond radius of 283 picometers and a lattice energy of −786 kJ/mol. The bond radii are similar but the charge numbers are not, with BaO having charge numbers of (+2,−2) and NaCl having (+1,−1); the Born–Landé equation predicts that the difference in charge numbers is the principal reason for the large difference in lattice energies.

=== Born–Mayer equation ===
In 1932, Born and Joseph E. Mayer refined the Born–Landé equation by replacing the power-law repulsive term with an exponential term $e^{-r_0/ \rho}$ which better accounts for the quantum mechanical repulsion effect between the ions. This equation improved the accuracy for the description of many ionic compounds:

$\Delta _{lat}U =- \frac{N_AMz^+z^- e^2 }{4 \pi \varepsilon_0 r_0}\left(1-\frac{\rho}{r_0}\right)$

where $N_A$ is the Avogadro constant, $M$ is the Madelung constant, $z^+$/$z^-$ are the charge numbers of the cations and anions, $e$ is the elementary charge (1.6022×10^{−19} C), $\varepsilon_0$ is the permittivity of free space (8.854×10^{−12} C^{2} J^{−1} m^{−1}), $r_0$ is the distance to the closest ion and $\rho$ is a constant that depends on the compressibility of the crystal (30 - 34.5 pm works well for alkali halides), used to represent the repulsion between ions at short range. Same as before, it can be seen that large values of $r_0$ results in low lattice energies, whereas high ionic charges result in high lattice energies.

=== Kapustinskii equation ===
Developed in 1956 by Anatolii Kapustinskii, this is a generalized empirical equation useful for a wide range of ionic compounds, including those with complex ions. It builds upon the previous equations and provides a simplified way to estimate the lattice energy of ionic compounds based on the charges and radii of the ions. It is an approximation that facilitates calculations compared to the Born–Landé and Born–Mayer equations, easier for quick estimates where high precision is not required.

$\Delta _{lat}U =-\frac{\kappa Z|z^+ z^-|}{r_0} \left(1 - \frac{\rho}{r_0}\right)$

where $\kappa$ is the Kapustinskii constant (1.202·10^{5} (kJ Å)/mol), $Z$ is the number of ions per formula unit, $z^+$/$z^-$ are the charge numbers of the cations and anions, $r_0$ is the distance to the closest ion and $\rho$ is a constant that depends on the compressibility of the crystal (30 - 34.5 pm works well for alkali halides), used to represent the repulsion between ions at short range.

=== Polarization effects ===
For certain ionic compounds, the calculation of the lattice energy requires the explicit inclusion of polarization effects. In these cases the polarization energy E_{pol} associated with ions on polar lattice sites may be included in the Born–Haber cycle. As an example, one may consider the case of iron-pyrite FeS_{2}. It has been shown that neglect of polarization led to a 15% difference between theory and experiment in the case of FeS_{2}, whereas including it reduced the error to 2%.

== Representative lattice energies ==
The following table presents a list of lattice energies for some common compounds as well as their structure type.

Compound	Experimental Lattice Energy	Structure type	Comment
LiF	−1030 kJ/mol	NaCl	difference vs. sodium chloride due to greater charge/radius for both cation and anion
NaCl	−786 kJ/mol	NaCl	reference compound for NaCl lattice
NaBr	−747 kJ/mol	NaCl	weaker lattice vs. NaCl
NaI	−704 kJ/mol	NaCl	weaker lattice vs. NaBr, soluble in acetone
CsCl	−657 kJ/mol	CsCl	reference compound for CsCl lattice
CsBr	−632 kJ/mol	CsCl	trend vs CsCl like NaCl vs. NaBr
CsI	−600 kJ/mol	CsCl	trend vs CsCl like NaCl vs. NaI
MgO	−3795 kJ/mol	NaCl	M^{2+}O^{2−} materials have high lattice energies vs. M^{+}O^{−}. MgO is insoluble in all solvents
CaO	−3414 kJ/mol	NaCl	M^{2+}O^{2−} materials have high lattice energies vs. M^{+}O^{−}. CaO is insoluble in all solvents
SrO	−3217 kJ/mol	NaCl	M^{2+}O^{2−} materials have high lattice energies vs. M^{+}O^{−}. SrO is insoluble in all solvents
MgF_{2}	−2922 kJ/mol	rutile	contrast with M^{2+}O^{2−}
TiO_{2}	−12150 kJ/mol	rutile	TiO_{2} (rutile) and some other M^{4+}(O^{2−})_{2} compounds are refractory materials

== See also ==
- Bond energy
- Born–Haber cycle
- Chemical bond
- Enthalpy of melting
- Enthalpy change of solution
- Heat of dilution
- Ionic conductivity
- Kapustinskii equation
- Madelung constant
