= Anatoli Kapustinskii =

- Born: Anatoli Fyodorovich Kapustinskii; December 29, 1906; Zhytomyr, Volhynian Governorate, Russian Empire
- Died: August 26, 1960 (aged 53); Moscow, RSFSR, Soviet Union

Anatoli Fyodorovich Kapustinskii (Russian: Анатолий Фёдорович Капустинский; 29 December 1906 – 26 August 1960) was a Soviet chemist. He derived the Kapustinskii equation that allows an estimation of the lattice energy of an ionic crystal.

== Biography ==
Kapustinskii was born in Zhytomyr, Russian Empire (now Ukraine). In 1914 he entered the Warsaw Primary Gymnasium, in 1922 he finished a Secondary School in Moscow. In 1923 he began his studies of chemistry at Moscow State University. He graduated there in 1929. From 1929 to 1941 he worked at the Institute of Applied Mineralogy in Moscow. During this time (1935) he worked in Western Europe and in the United States where he spent about six months working with Gilbert N. Lewis at the University of California.

== Scientific career ==
- 1933-1937: Professor and Director of the Department of Physical Chemistry of Gorky State University.
- 1937-1941: Moscow Institute of Steel.
- 1941-1943: Kazan State University.
- from 1943: Department of General and Inorganic Chemistry of the Moscow D. Mendeleev Institute of Chemical Technology.
- 1939: Corresponding Member of the Academy of Sciences of the Soviet Union.
- from 1946: Main editorial Board of the Great Soviet Encyclopedia.
- 1960: Honorary member of the Polish Chemical Society.

== Sources ==
- Obituary from Izvestiya Akademii Nauk SSSR
- Centenary Article in Russian Journal of Physical Chemistry A, 2007, Vol. 81, No. 8, pp. 1352–1354.
