= Ionic crystal =

Crystalline form of an ionic compound

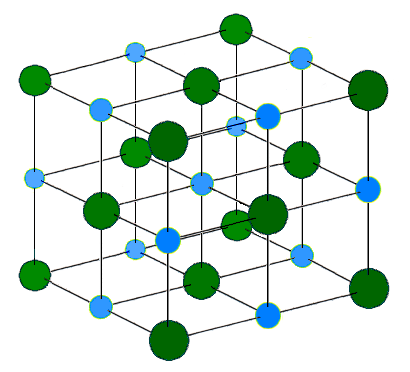
Sodium chloride (halite) crystal structure. Each atom has six nearest neighbors, with octahedral geometry. This arrangement is known as cubic close packed (ccp). Na^{+} Cl^{−}

In chemistry, an ionic crystal is a crystalline form of an ionic compound. They are solids consisting of ions bound together by their electrostatic attraction into a regular lattice. Examples of such crystals are the alkali halides, including potassium fluoride (KF), potassium chloride (KCl), potassium bromide (KBr), potassium iodide (KI), sodium fluoride (NaF). Sodium chloride (NaCl) has a 6:6 co-ordination. The properties of NaCl reflect the strong interactions that exist between the ions. It is a good conductor of electricity when molten, but very poor in the solid state. When fused the mobile ions carry charge through the liquid. They are characterized by strong absorption of infrared radiation and have planes along which they cleave easily. The exact arrangement of ions in an ionic lattice varies according to the size of the ions in the solid.
