= Titanyl =

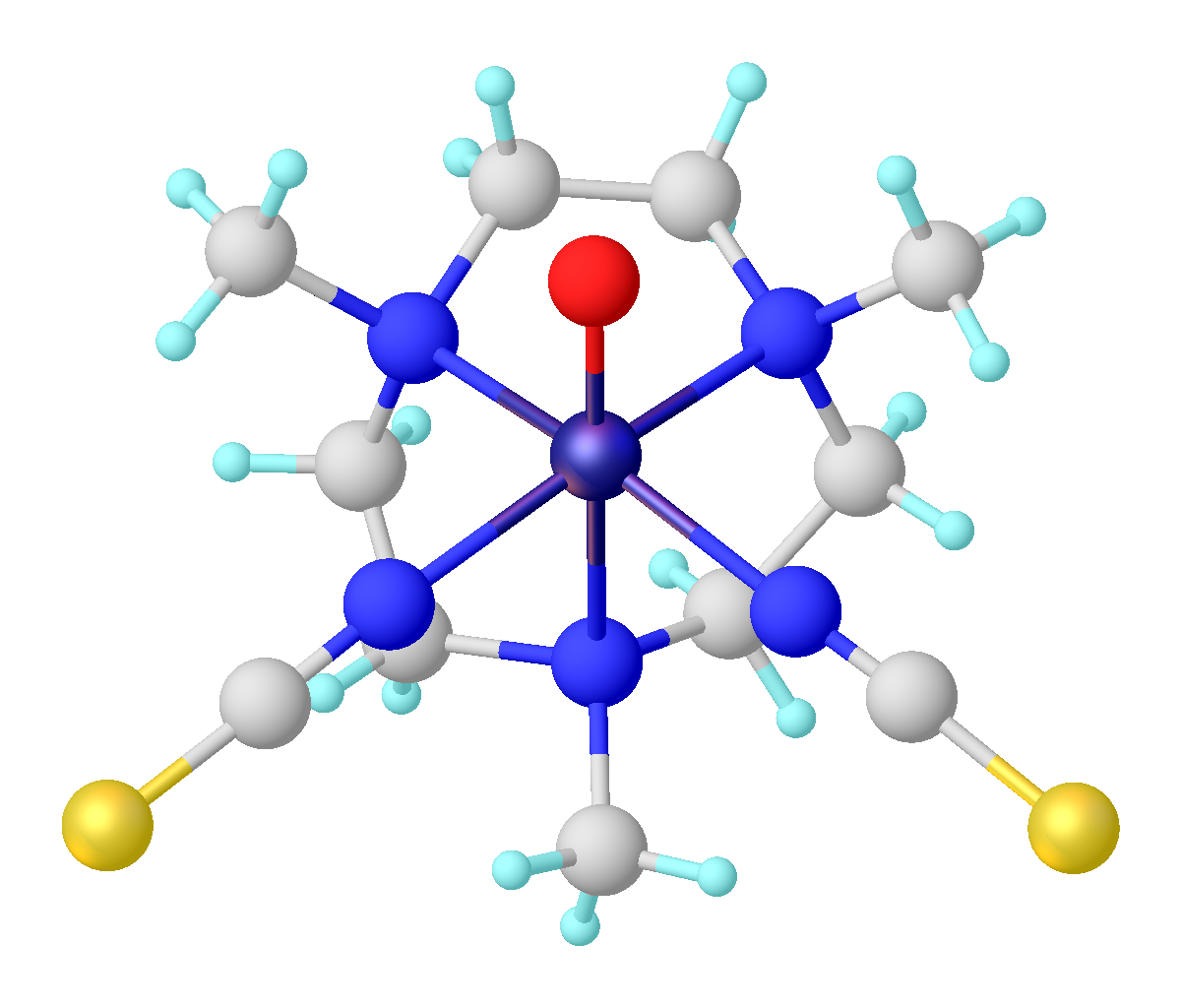
Structure of OTi(NCS)_{2}(Me_{3}tacn).

In inorganic chemistry, titanyl refers to the functional group Ti^{IV}O, sometimes written TiO^{2+}. The term titanyl is used loosely to describe many titanium(IV) oxide compounds and complexes. For example, titanyl sulfate and potassium titanyl phosphate contain Ti^{IV}O centers with the connectivity O-Ti-O-Ti. In heterogeneous catalysis, titanyl refers to a terminal oxo ligand on a surface titanium(IV) center. There are a few molecular titanyl complexes where the oxo ligand is terminal, not bridging. In these cases the titanyl group is described as having a triple bond, i.e., Ti≡O.
