= Knee buckle =

Knee buckle may refer to:

- A fashion accessory used to fasten knee breeches at or just below the knee
- A shoe buckle used to fasten the knee-high boots just below the level of the knee.
- Knee buckling, a medical condition
