= Pyrite =

Iron (II) disulfide mineral

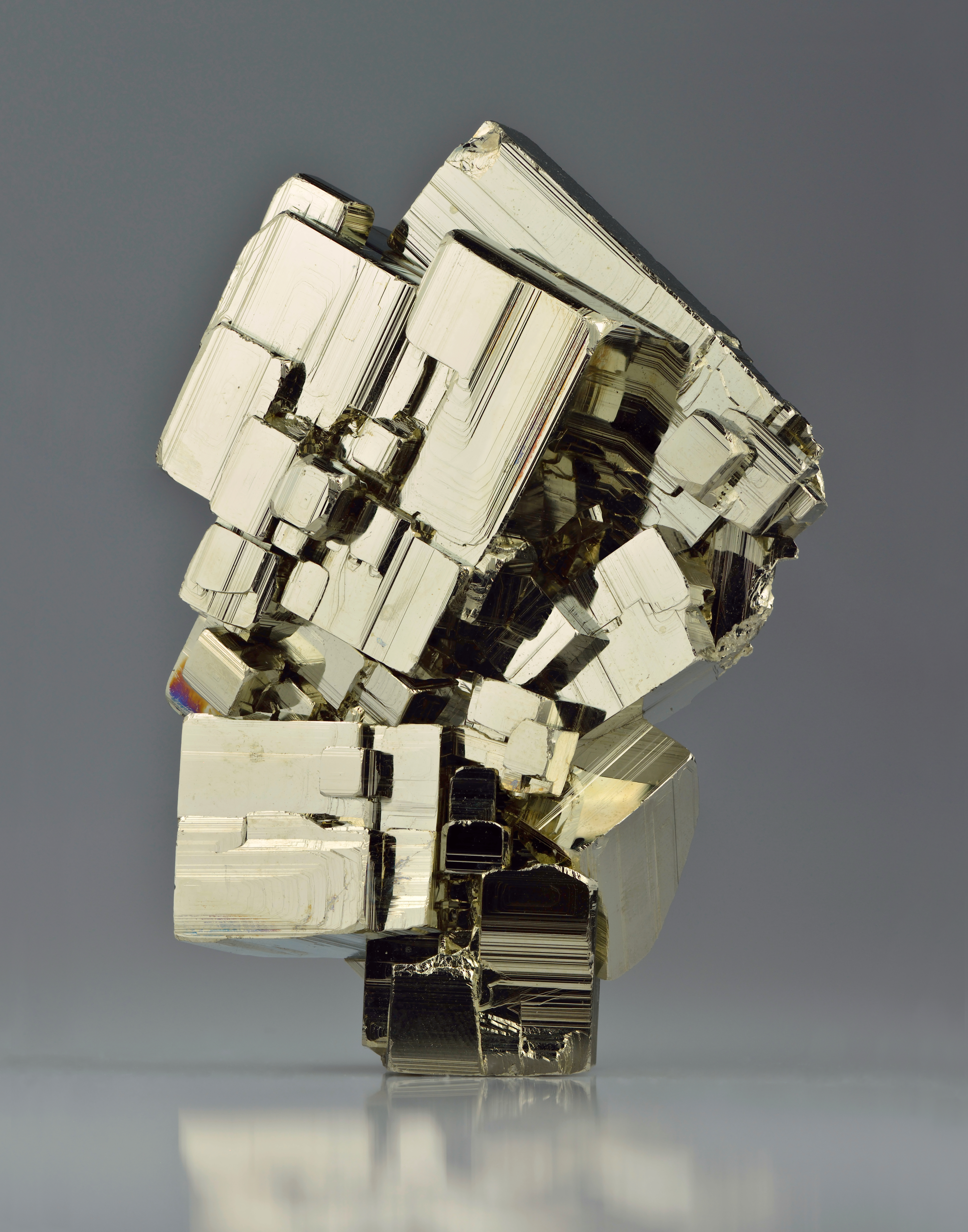
- Intergrowth of lustrous, cubic crystals of pyrite, with some surfaces showing characteristic striations, from Huanzala mine, Ancash, Peru. Specimen size: 7.0 × 5.0 × 2.5 cm

General
- Category: Sulfide mineral
- Formula: FeS_{2}
- IMA symbol: Py
- Strunz classification: 2.EB.05a
- Dana classification: 2.12.1.1
- Crystal system: Cubic
- Crystal class: Diploidal (m3̅); H-M symbol: (2/m 3̅)
- Space group: Pa3̅
- Unit cell: a = 5.417 Å, Z = 4

Identification
- Formula mass: 119.98 g/mol
- Color: Pale brass-yellow reflective; tarnishes darker and iridescent
- Crystal habit: Cubic, faces may be striated, but also frequently octahedral and pyritohedral. Often inter-grown, massive, radiated, granular, globular, and stalactitic.
- Twinning: Penetration and contact twinning
- Cleavage: Indistinct on {001}; partings on {011} and {111}
- Fracture: Very uneven, sometimes conchoidal
- Tenacity: Brittle
- Mohs scale hardness: 6–6.5
- Luster: Metallic, glistening
- Streak: Greenish-black to brownish-black
- Diaphaneity: Opaque
- Specific gravity: 4.95–5.10
- Density: 4.8–5 g/cm^{3} (0.17–0.18 lb/cu in)
- Fusibility: 2.5–3 to a magnetic globule
- Solubility: Insoluble in water
- Other characteristics: Diamagnetic to paramagnetic A semiconductor with bandgap of 0.72 to 3.26 eV.

The mineral pyrite (/ˈpaɪraɪt/ PY-ryte), or iron pyrite, also known as fool's gold, is an iron sulfide with the chemical formula FeS_{2} (iron (II) disulfide). Pyrite is the most abundant sulfide mineral.

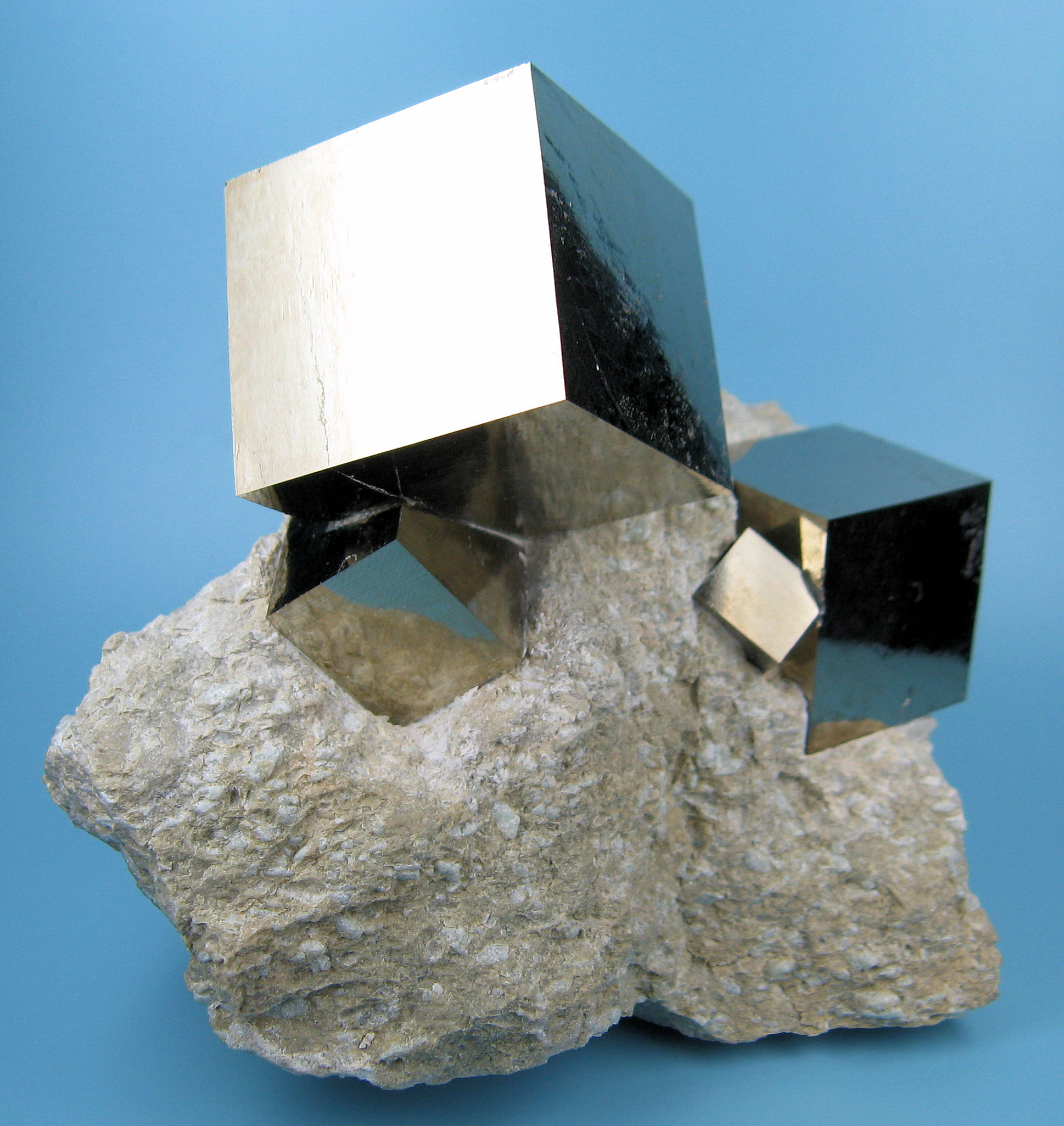
Pyrite cubic crystals on marl from Navajún, La Rioja, Spain (size: 95 by 78 millimetres [3.7 by 3.1 in], 512 grams [18.1 oz]; main crystal: 31 millimetres [1.2 in] on edge)

Pyrite's metallic luster and pale brass-yellow hue give it a superficial resemblance to gold, hence the well-known nickname of fool's gold. The color has also led to the nicknames brass, brazzle, and brazil, primarily used to refer to pyrite found in coal.

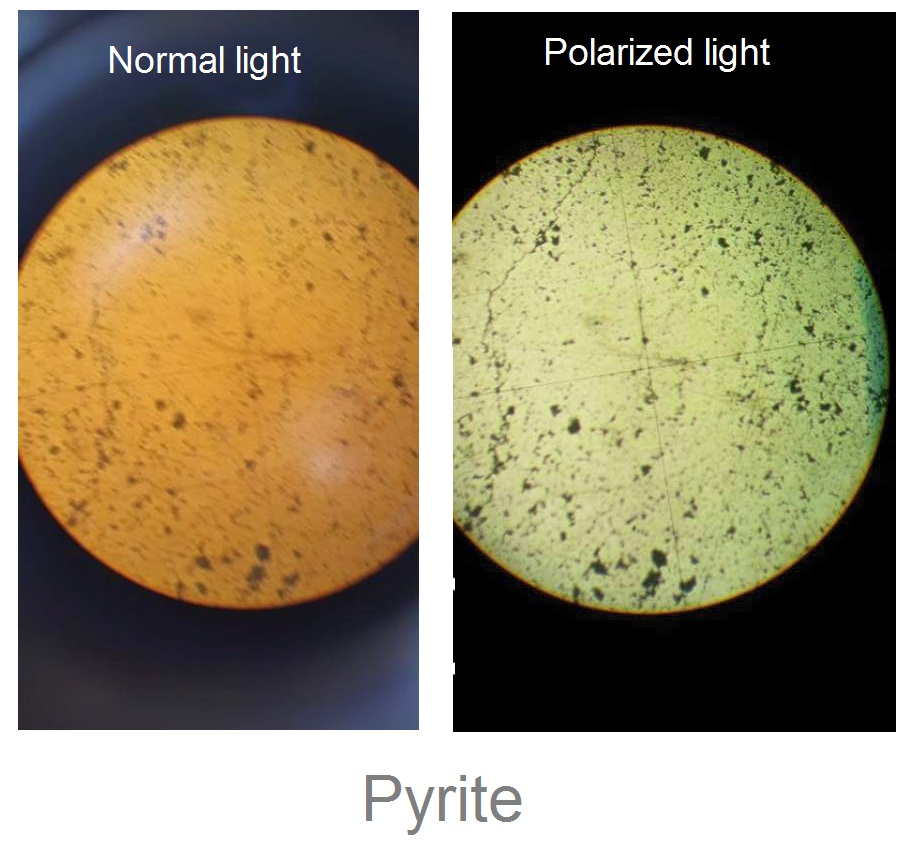
Pyrite under normal and polarized light

Pyrite is usually found associated with other sulfides or oxides in quartz veins, sedimentary rock, and metamorphic rock, as well as in coal beds and as a replacement mineral in fossils, but has also been identified in the sclerites of scaly-foot gastropods. Despite being nicknamed "fool's gold", pyrite is sometimes found in association with small quantities of actual gold. A substantial proportion of this is "invisible gold" incorporated into the pyrite. It has been suggested that the presence of both gold and arsenic is a case of coupled substitution. However, as of 1997, the chemical state of the gold remained controversial.

== Etymology ==
The name pyrite is derived from the Greek πυρίτης λίθος (pyritēs lithos), 'stone or mineral which strikes fire', in turn from πῦρ (pŷr), 'fire'. In ancient Roman times, this name was applied to several types of stone that would create sparks when struck against steel; Pliny the Elder described one of them as being brassy, almost certainly a reference to what is now called pyrite. By Georgius Agricola's time, c. 1550, the term had become a generic term for all of the sulfide minerals.

== Uses ==
=== Historical ===
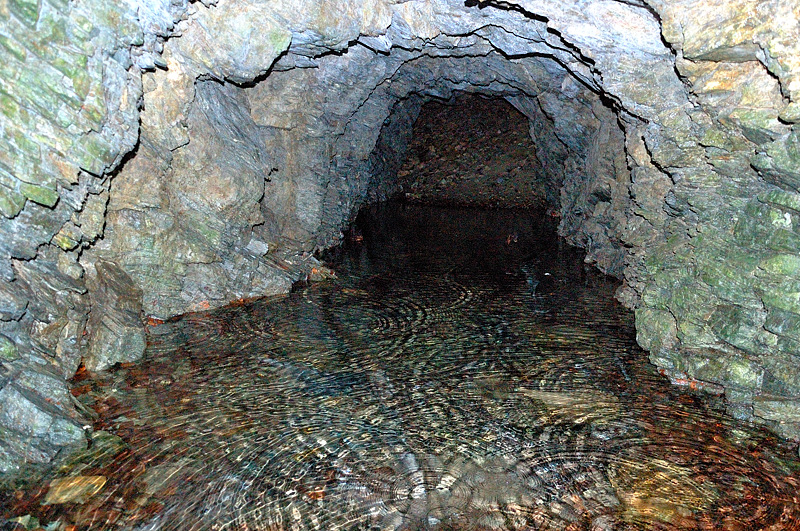
An abandoned pyrite mine near Pernek in Slovakia

The oldest definitive evidence for fire making (i.e. igniting a new fire) dates to ~400,000 years ago at a Neanderthal site in Suffolk, England, where burnt soil was found along with fire-cracked flint handaxes and two fragments of iron pyrite, used to strike sparks with flint. At other sites in France dating from 50,000 years ago onwards, dozens of Neanderthal hand axes exhibit use-wear traces suggesting they were struck with pyrite to produce sparks. Ötzi, a well-preserved natural mummy of a man who lived in the Ötztal Alps between 3350 and 3105 BCE, carried fire-making material in the form of tinder fungus with flint and pyrite for creating sparks.

The Kaurna people of South Australia have used pyrite with flintstone and a form of tinder made of stringybark as a traditional method of starting fires.

Pyrite has been used since classical times to manufacture copperas (ferrous sulfate). Iron pyrite was heaped up and allowed to weather (an example of an early form of heap leaching). The acidic runoff from the heap was then boiled with iron to produce iron sulfate. In the 15th century, new methods of such leaching began to replace the burning of sulfur as a source of sulfuric acid. By the 19th century it had become the dominant method.

Marcasite jewelry, using small faceted pieces of pyrite, often set in silver, has been made since ancient times and was popular in the Victorian era. When the term became common in jewelry making, "marcasite" referred to all iron sulfides including pyrite, and not to the eponymous orthorhombic FeS_{2} mineral marcasite, which is lighter in color, brittle and chemically unstable, and thus not suitable for jewelry making.

Pyrite gained a brief popularity in the 16th and 17th centuries as a source of ignition in early firearms, most notably the wheellock, where a sample of pyrite was placed against a circular file to strike the sparks needed to fire the gun.

During the early years of the 20th century, pyrite was used as a mineral detector in radio receivers, and is still used by crystal radio hobbyists. Until the vacuum tube matured, the crystal detector was the most sensitive and dependable detector available—with considerable variation between mineral types and even individual samples within a particular type of mineral. Pyrite detectors occupied a midway point between galena detectors and the more mechanically complicated perikon mineral pairs. Pyrite detectors can be as sensitive as a modern 1N34A germanium diode detector.

=== Present day ===
Pyrite remains in commercial use for the production of sulfur dioxide, for use in such applications as the paper industry, and in the manufacture of sulfuric acid. Thermal decomposition of pyrite into FeS (iron(II) sulfide) and elemental sulfur starts at 540 °C (1,004 °F); at around 700 °C (1,292 °F), p_{S_{2}} is about 1 atm.

A newer commercial use for pyrite is as the cathode material in Energizer brand non-rechargeable lithium metal batteries.

Pyrite is a semiconductor material with a band gap of 0.95 eV. Pure pyrite is naturally n-type, in both crystal and thin-film forms, potentially due to sulfur vacancies in the pyrite crystal structure acting as n-dopants.

Pyrite has been proposed as an abundant, non-toxic, inexpensive material in low-cost photovoltaic solar panels due to its high absorption of visible light. Synthetic iron sulfide can be used with copper sulfide to create the photovoltaic material. More recent efforts are working toward thin-film solar cells made entirely of pyrite.

Pyrite specimens are also very popular in mineral collecting. Among the sites that provide the most sought-after specimens are Soria and La Rioja provinces (Spain).

In terms of monetary value, China constitutes the largest market for imported unroasted iron pyrites worldwide, at $47 million, making up 65% of global imports. It is also the fastest growing, with a CAGR of +27.8% from 2007 to 2016.

== Research ==
In July 2020 scientists reported that they have observed a voltage-induced transformation of normally diamagnetic pyrite into a ferromagnetic material, which may lead to applications in devices such as solar cells or magnetic data storage.

Researchers at Trinity College Dublin, Ireland have demonstrated that FeS_{2} can be exfoliated into few-layers just like other two-dimensional layered materials such as graphene by a simple liquid-phase exfoliation route. This is the first study to demonstrate the production of non-layered 2D-platelets from 3D bulk FeS_{2}. Furthermore, they have used these 2D-platelets with 20% single walled carbon-nanotube as an anode material in lithium-ion batteries, reaching a capacity of 1000 mAh/g close to the theoretical capacity of FeS_{2}.

In 2021, a natural pyrite stone was crushed and pre-treated followed by liquid-phase exfoliation into two-dimensional nanosheets, which showed capacities of 1200 mAh/g as an anode in lithium-ion batteries.

== Formal oxidation states for pyrite, marcasite, molybdenite and arsenopyrite ==
From the perspective of classical inorganic chemistry, which assigns formal oxidation states to each atom, pyrite and marcasite are probably best described as Fe^{2+}[S_{2}]^{2−}. This formalism recognizes that the sulfur atoms in pyrite occur in pairs with clear S−S bonds. These persulfide [^{−}S−S^{−}] units can be viewed as derived from hydrogen disulfide, H_{2}S_{2}. Thus pyrite would be more descriptively called iron persulfide, not iron disulfide. In contrast, molybdenite, MoS_{2}, features isolated sulfide S^{2−} centers and the oxidation state of molybdenum is Mo^{4+}. The mineral arsenopyrite has the formula FeAsS. Whereas pyrite has [S_{2}]^{2−} units, arsenopyrite has [AsS]^{3−} units, formally derived from deprotonation of arsenothiol (H_{2}AsSH). Analysis of classical oxidation states would recommend the description of arsenopyrite as Fe^{3+}[AsS]^{3−}.

== Crystallography ==
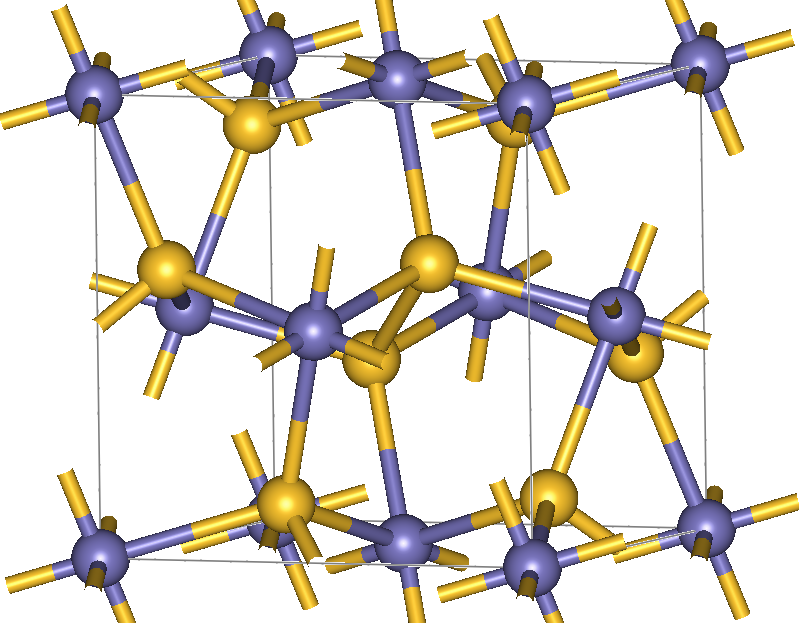
Crystal structure of pyrite. In the center of the cell a S_{2}^{2−} pair is seen in yellow.

Iron-pyrite FeS_{2} represents the prototype compound of the crystallographic pyrite structure. The structure is cubic and was among the first crystal structures solved by X-ray diffraction. It belongs to the crystallographic space group Pa3̅ and is denoted by the Strukturbericht notation C2. Under thermodynamic standard conditions the lattice constant $a$ of stoichiometric iron pyrite FeS_{2} amounts to 541.87 pm. The unit cell is composed of a Fe face-centered cubic sublattice into which the S_{2} ions are embedded. (Note though that the iron atoms in the faces are not equivalent by translation alone to the iron atoms at the corners.) The pyrite structure is also seen in other MX_{2} compounds of transition metals M and chalcogens X = O, S, Se and Te. Certain dipnictides with X standing for P, As and Sb etc. are also known to adopt the pyrite structure.

The Fe atoms are bonded to six S atoms, giving a distorted octahedron. The material is a semiconductor. The Fe ions are usually considered to be low spin divalent state (as shown by Mössbauer spectroscopy as well as XPS). The material as a whole behaves as a Van Vleck paramagnet, despite its low-spin divalency.

The sulfur centers occur in pairs, described as S^{2−}_{2}. Reduction of pyrite with potassium gives potassium dithioferrate, KFeS_{2}. This material features ferric ions and isolated sulfide (S^{2−}) centers.

The S atoms are tetrahedral, being bonded to three Fe centers and one other S atom. The site symmetry at Fe and S positions is accounted for by point symmetry groups C_{3i} and C_{3}, respectively. The missing center of inversion at S lattice sites has important consequences for the crystallographic and physical properties of iron pyrite. These consequences derive from the crystal electric field active at the sulfur lattice site, which causes a polarization of S ions in the pyrite lattice. The polarisation can be calculated on the basis of higher-order Madelung constants and has to be included in the calculation of the lattice energy by using a generalised Born–Haber cycle. This reflects the fact that the covalent bond in the sulfur pair is inadequately accounted for by a strictly ionic treatment.

Arsenopyrite has a related structure with heteroatomic As–S pairs rather than S-S pairs. Marcasite also possesses homoatomic anion pairs, but the arrangement of the metal and diatomic anions differs from that of pyrite. Despite its name, chalcopyrite (CuFeS_{2}) does not contain dianion pairs, but single S^{2−} sulfide anions.

== Crystal habit ==
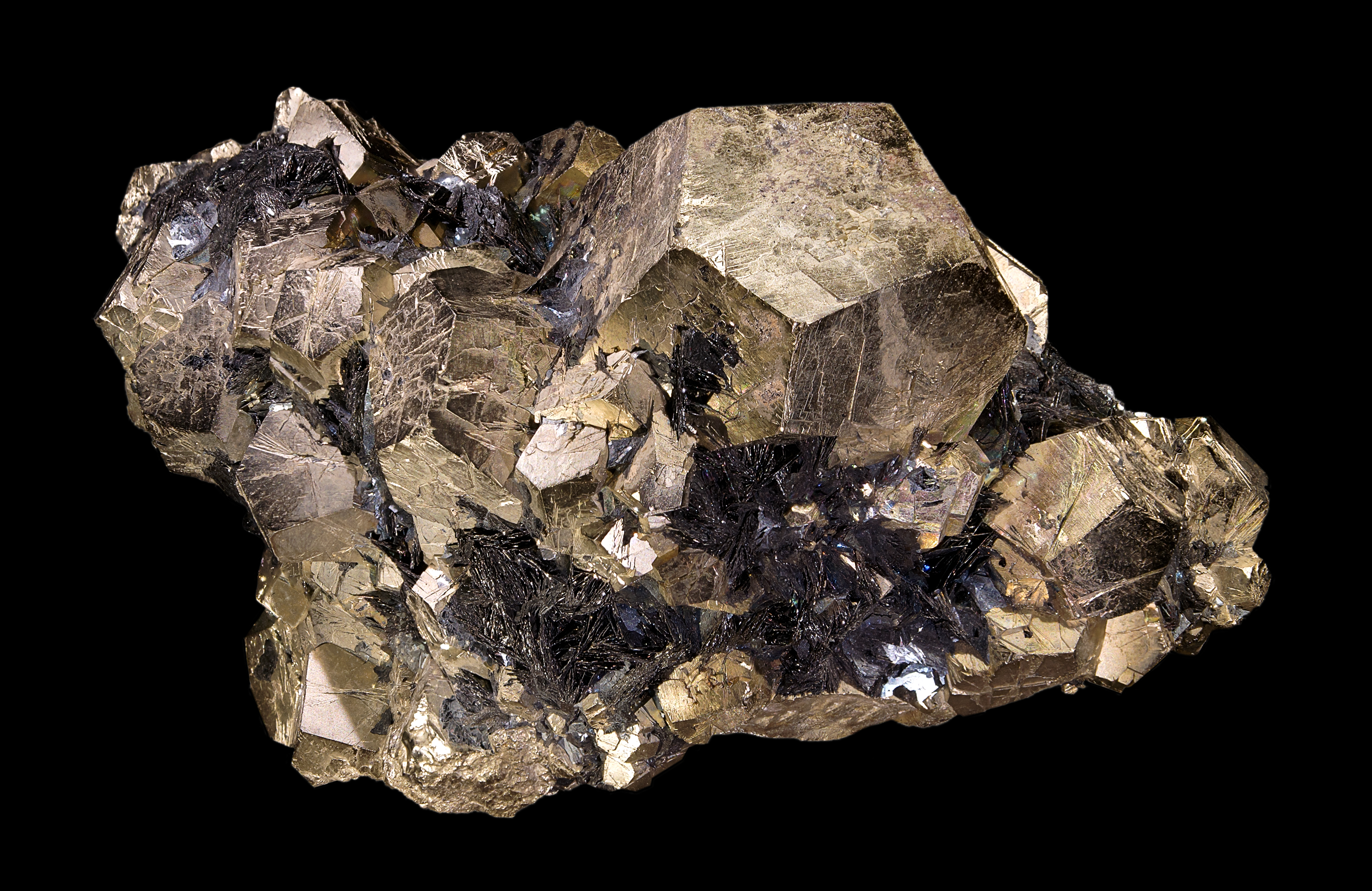
Pyritohedron-shaped crystals from Italy

Pyrite usually forms cuboid crystals, sometimes forming in close association to form raspberry-shaped masses called framboids. However, under certain circumstances, it can form anastomosing filaments or T-shaped crystals. Pyrite can also form shapes almost the same as a regular dodecahedron, known as pyritohedra, and this suggests an explanation for the artificial geometrical models found in Europe as early as the 5th century BC.

== Varieties ==
Cattierite (CoS_{2}), vaesite (NiS_{2}) and hauerite (MnS_{2}), as well as sperrylite (PtAs_{2}) are similar in their structure and belong also to the pyrite group.

Bravoite is a nickel-cobalt bearing variety of pyrite, with > 50% substitution of Ni^{2+} for Fe^{2+} within pyrite. Bravoite is not a formally recognised mineral, and is named after the Peruvian scientist Jose J. Bravo (1874–1928).

== Distinguishing similar minerals ==
Pyrite is distinguishable from native gold by its hardness, brittleness and crystal form. Pyrite fractures are very uneven, sometimes conchoidal because it does not cleave along a preferential plane. Native gold nuggets, or glitters, do not break but deform in a ductile way. Pyrite is brittle, gold is malleable. Natural gold tends to be anhedral (irregularly shaped without well defined faces), whereas pyrite comes as either cubes or multifaceted crystals with well developed and sharp faces easy to recognise. Well crystallised pyrite crystals are euhedral (i.e., with nice faces). Pyrite can often be distinguished by the striations which, in many cases, can be seen on its surface.

Chalcopyrite (CuFeS_{2}) is brighter yellow with a greenish hue when wet and is softer (3.5–4 on Mohs' scale). Arsenopyrite (FeAsS) is silver white and does not become more yellow when wet.

== Hazards ==
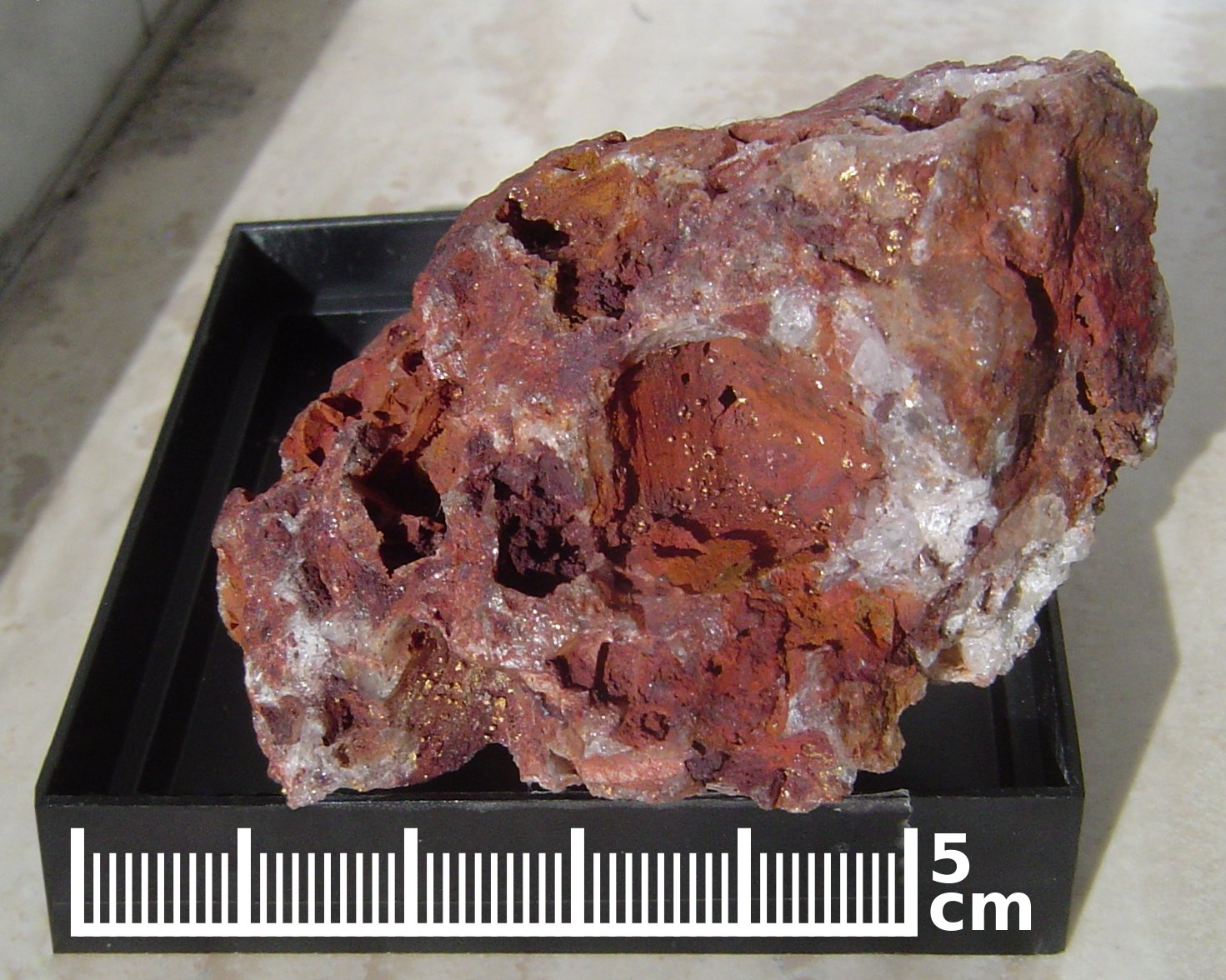
A pyrite cube (center) has dissolved away from a host rock, leaving behind trace gold

Iron pyrite is unstable when exposed to the oxidizing conditions prevailing at the Earth's surface: iron pyrite in contact with atmospheric oxygen and water, or damp, ultimately decomposes into iron oxyhydroxides (ferrihydrite, FeO(OH)) and sulfuric acid (H_{2}SO_{4}). This process is accelerated by the action of Acidithiobacillus bacteria which oxidize pyrite to first produce ferrous ions (Fe^{2+}), sulfate ions (SO^{2−}_{4}), and release protons ( H^{+}, or H_{3}O^{+}). In a second step, the ferrous ions (Fe^{2+}) are oxidized by O_{2} into ferric ions (Fe^{3+}) which hydrolyze also releasing H^{+} ions and producing FeO(OH). These oxidation reactions occur more rapidly when pyrite is finely dispersed (framboidal crystals initially formed by sulfate reducing bacteria (SRB) in argillaceous sediments or dust from mining operations).

=== Pyrite oxidation and acid mine drainage ===
Pyrite oxidation by atmospheric O_{2} in the presence of moisture (H_{2}O) initially produces ferrous ions (Fe^{2+}) and sulfuric acid which dissociates into sulfate ions and protons, leading to acid mine drainage (AMD). An example of acid rock drainage caused by pyrite is the 2015 Gold King Mine waste water spill.

2 FeS_{2}(s) + 7 O_{2}(g) + 2 H_{2}O(l) → 2 Fe^{2+}(aq) + 4 SO^{2−}_{4}(aq) + 4 H^{+}(aq)

=== Dust explosions ===
Pyrite oxidation is sufficiently exothermic that underground coal mines in high-sulfur coal seams have occasionally had serious problems with spontaneous combustion. The solution is the use of buffer blasting and the use of various sealing or cladding agents to hermetically seal the mined-out areas to exclude oxygen.

In modern coal mines, limestone dust is sprayed onto the exposed coal surfaces to reduce the hazard of dust explosions. This has the secondary benefit of neutralizing the acid released by pyrite oxidation and therefore slowing the oxidation cycle described above, thus reducing the likelihood of spontaneous combustion. In the long term, however, oxidation continues, and the hydrated sulfates formed may exert crystallization pressure that can expand cracks in the rock and lead eventually to roof fall.

=== Weakened building materials ===
Building stone containing pyrite tends to stain brown as the pyrite oxidizes. This problem appears to be significantly worse if any marcasite is present. The presence of pyrite in the aggregate used to make concrete can lead to severe deterioration as pyrite oxidizes. In early 2009, problems with Chinese drywall imported into the United States after Hurricane Katrina were attributed to pyrite oxidation, followed by microbial sulfate reduction which released hydrogen sulfide gas (H_{2}S). These problems included a foul odor and corrosion of copper wiring. In the United States, in Canada, and more recently in Ireland, where it was used as underfloor infill, pyrite contamination has caused major structural damage. Concrete exposed to sulfate ions, or sulfuric acid, degrades by sulfate attack: the formation of expansive mineral phases, such as ettringite (small needle crystals exerting a huge crystallization pressure inside the concrete pores) and gypsum creates inner tensile forces in the concrete matrix which destroy the hardened cement paste, form cracks and fissures in concrete, and can lead to the ultimate ruin of the structure. Normalized tests for construction aggregate certify such materials as free of pyrite or marcasite.

== Occurrence ==
Pyrite is the most common of sulfide minerals and is widespread in igneous, metamorphic, and sedimentary rocks. It is a common accessory mineral in igneous rocks, where it also occasionally occurs as larger masses arising from an immiscible sulfide phase in the original magma. It is found in metamorphic rocks as a product of contact metamorphism. It also forms as a high-temperature hydrothermal mineral, though it occasionally forms at lower temperatures.

Pyrite occurs both as a primary mineral, present in the original sediments, and as a secondary mineral, deposited during diagenesis. Pyrite and marcasite commonly occur as replacement pseudomorphs after fossils in black shale and other sedimentary rocks formed under reducing environmental conditions. Pyrite is common as an accessory mineral in shale, where it is formed by precipitation from anoxic seawater, and coal beds often contain significant pyrite.

Notable deposits are found as lenticular masses in Virginia, U.S., and in smaller quantities in many other locations. Large deposits are mined at Rio Tinto in Spain and elsewhere in the Iberian Peninsula.

== Cultural beliefs ==
In the beliefs of the Thai people (especially those in the south), pyrite is known as Khao tok Phra Ruang, Khao khon bat Phra Ruang (ข้าวตอกพระร่วง, ข้าวก้นบาตรพระร่วง) or Phet na tang, Hin na tang (เพชรหน้าทั่ง, หินหน้าทั่ง). It is believed to be a sacred item that has the power to prevent evil, black magic or demons.

== Gallery ==
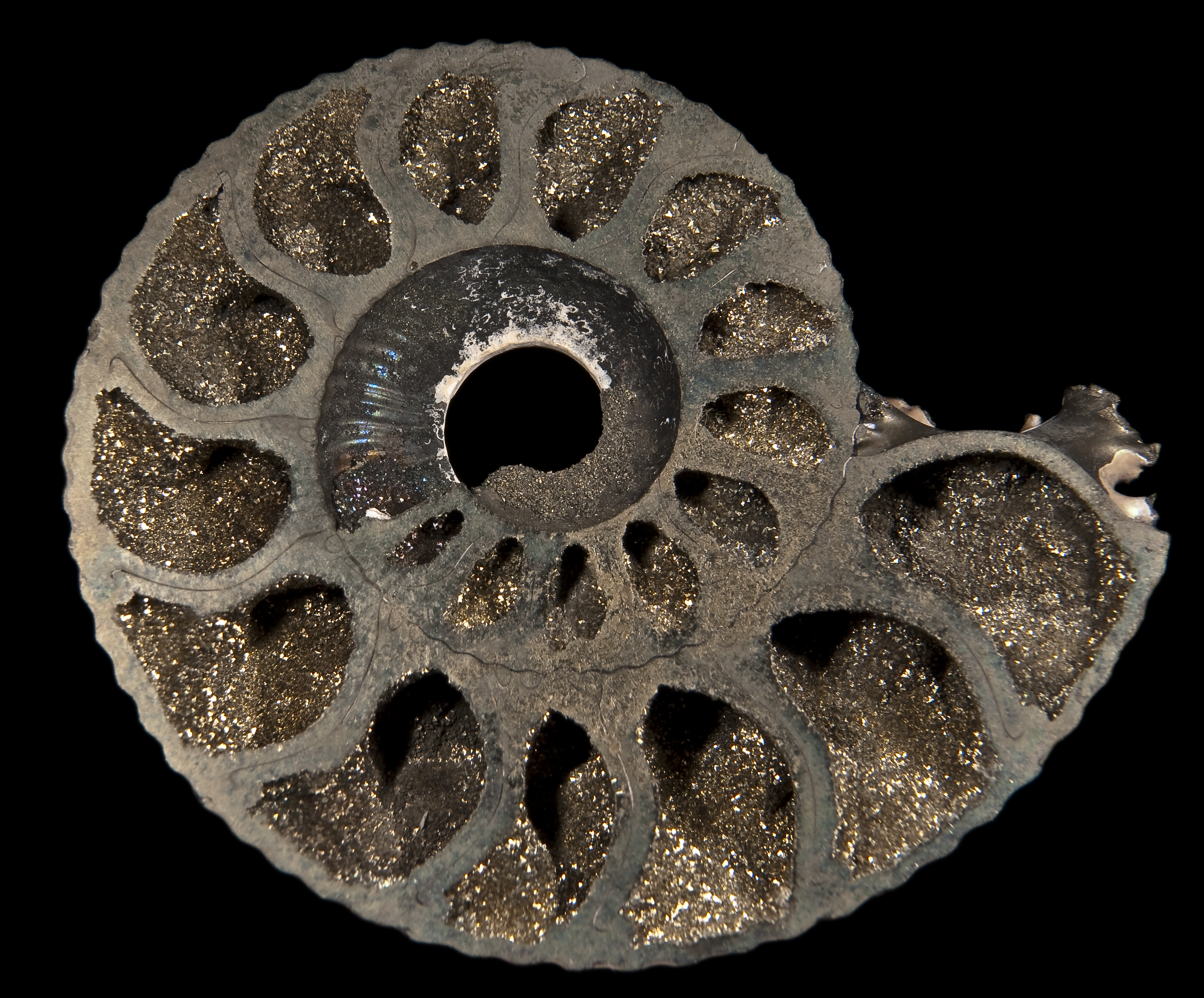
Pyrite as a replacement mineral in an ammonite from France

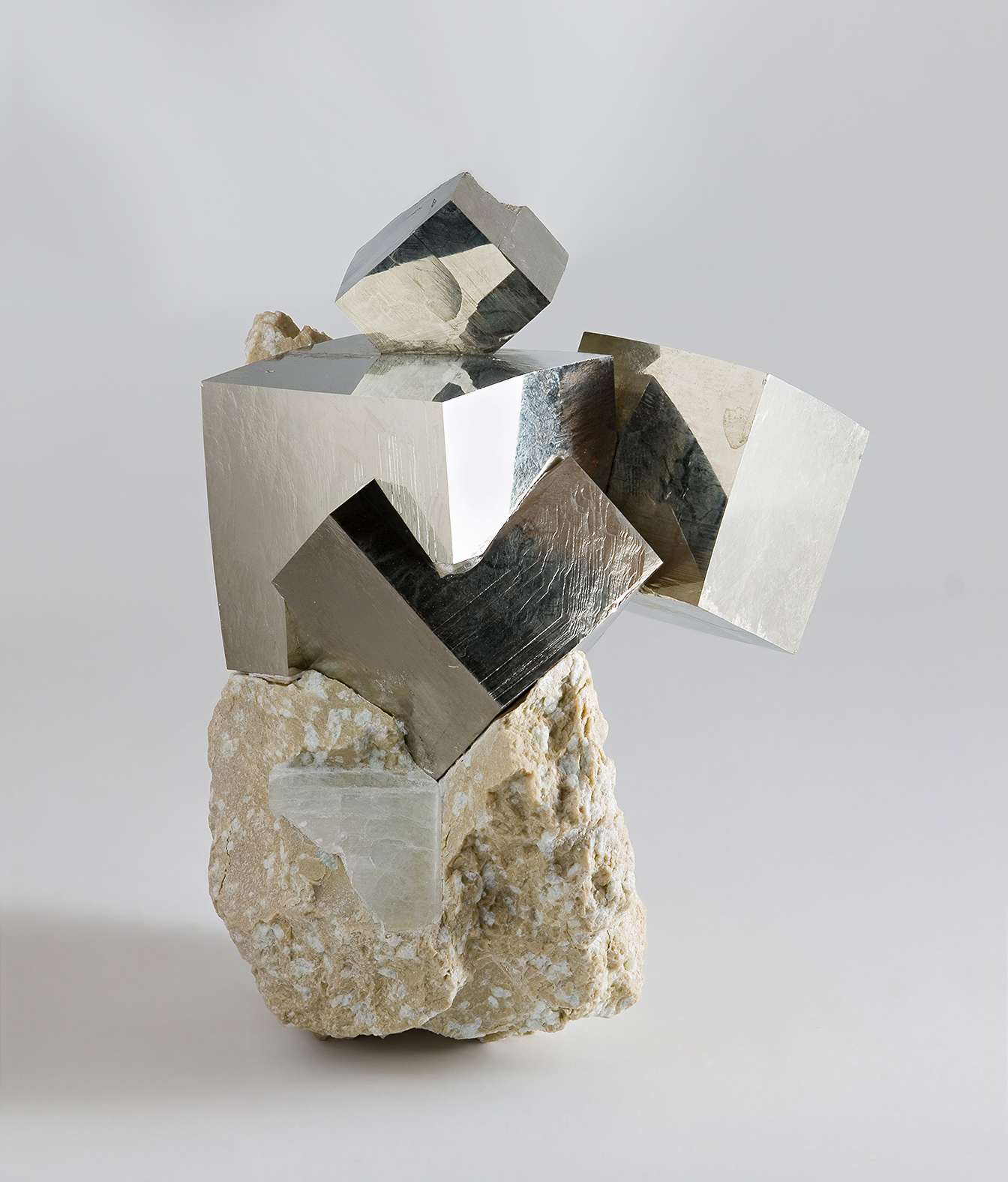
Pyrite from Ampliación a Victoria Mine, Navajún, La Rioja, Spain

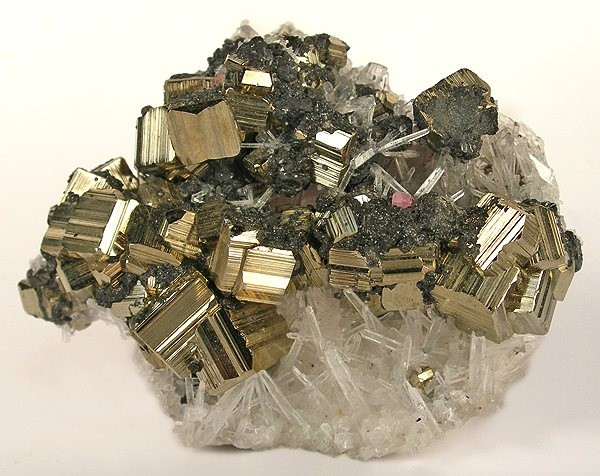
Pyrite from the Sweet Home Mine, with golden striated cubes intergrown with minor tetrahedrite, on a bed of transparent quartz needles

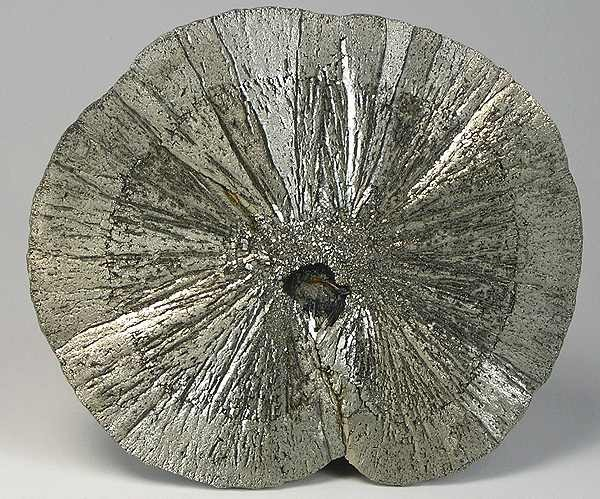
Radiating form of pyrite

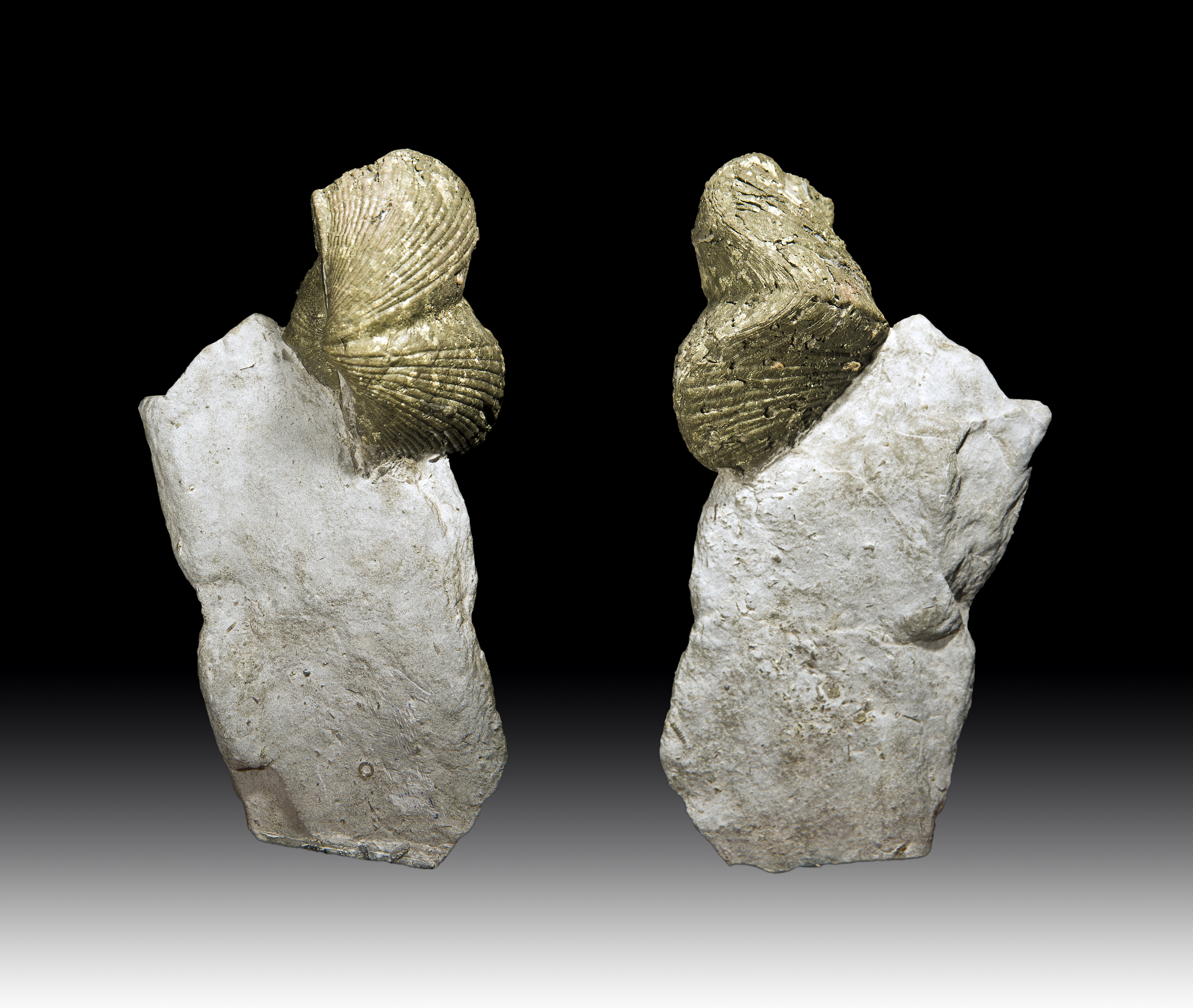
Paraspirifer bownockeri in pyrite

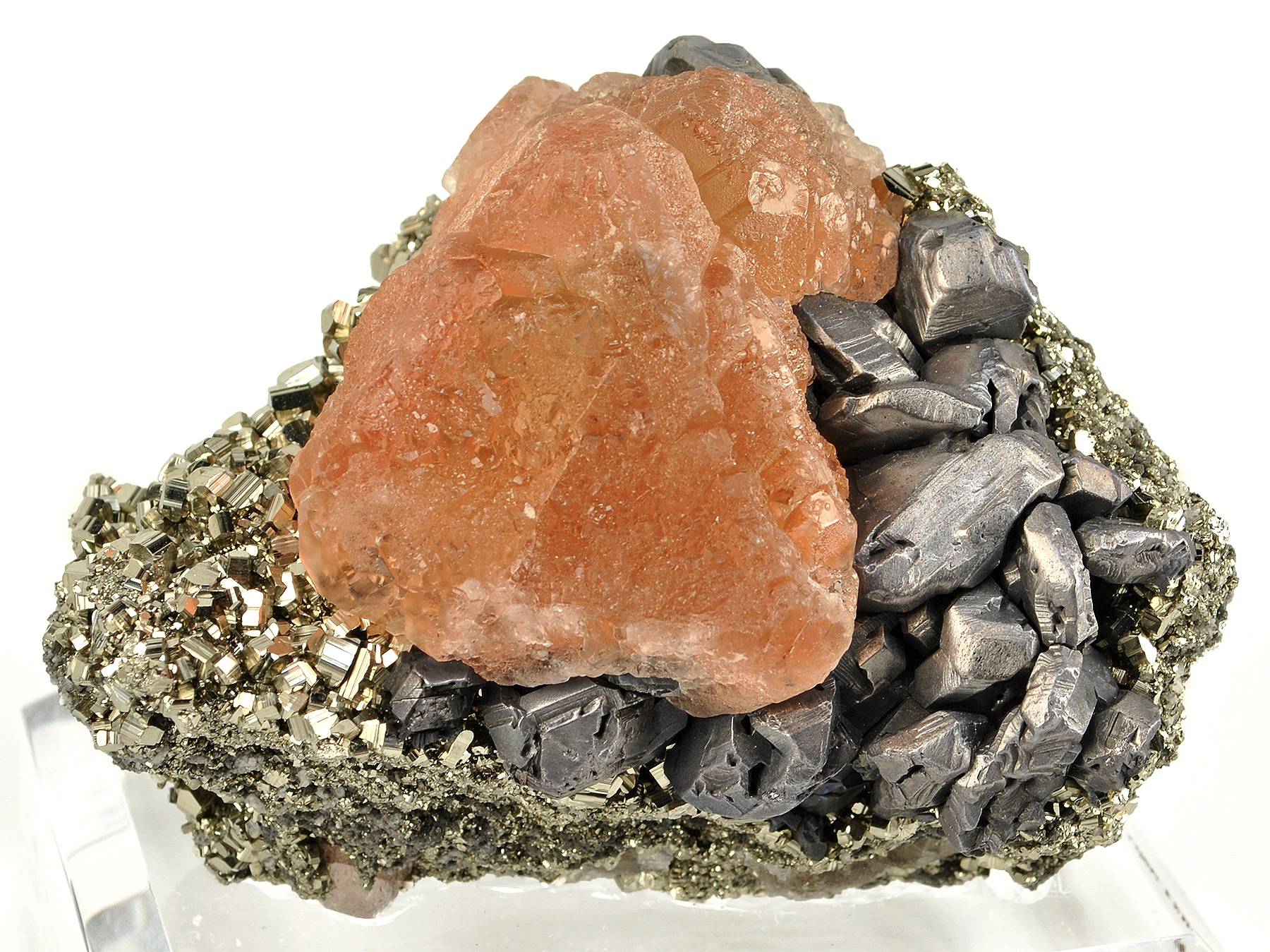
Pink fluorite perched between pyrite (left) and metallic galena (right)

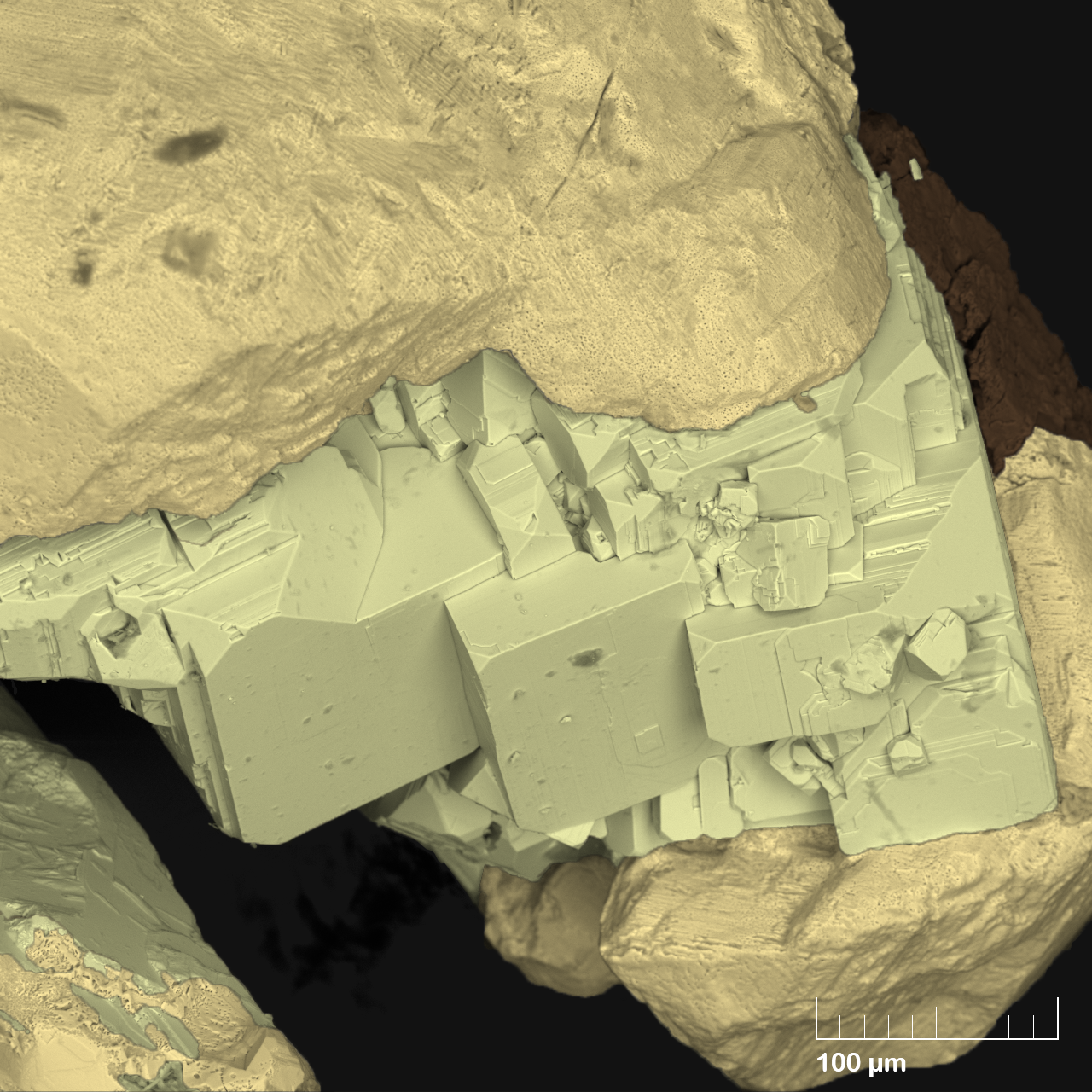
SEM image of intergrowth of pyrite cuboctahedral crystals (yellow) and pyrrhotite (pinkish yellow)

== See also ==
- Iron–sulfur world hypothesis
- Sulfur isotope biogeochemistry
