= Cut steel jewellery =

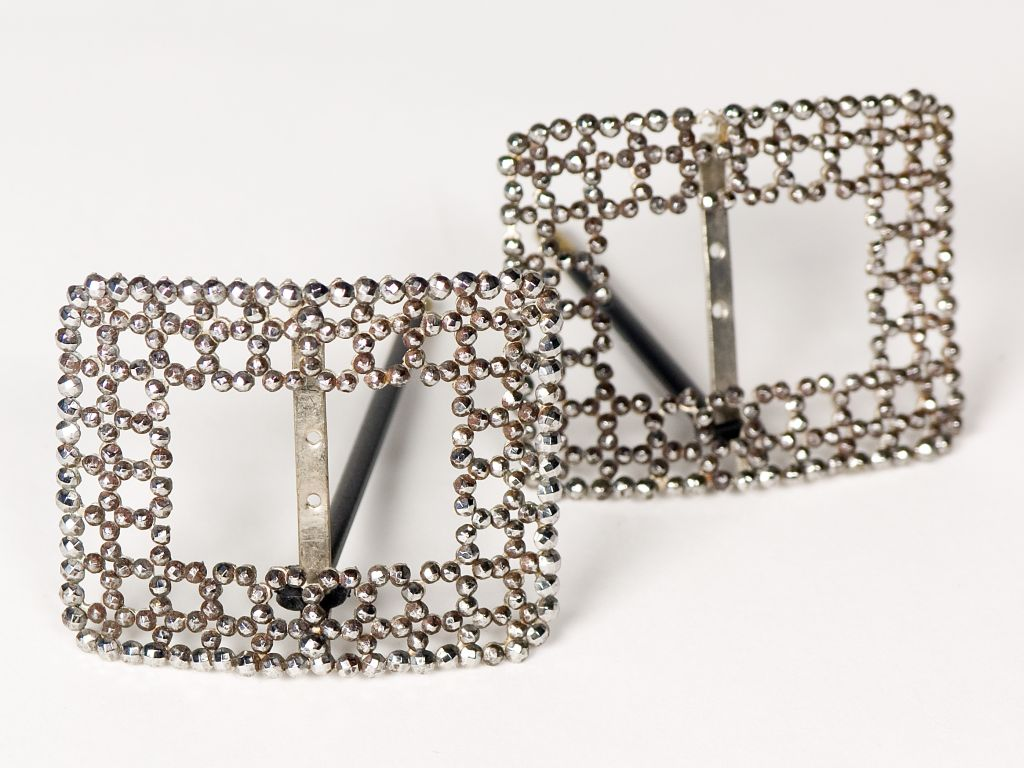
A pair of cut steel Shoe buckles

Cut steel jewellery is a form of jewellery composed of steel that was popular between the 18th century and the end of the 1930s.

== Design ==
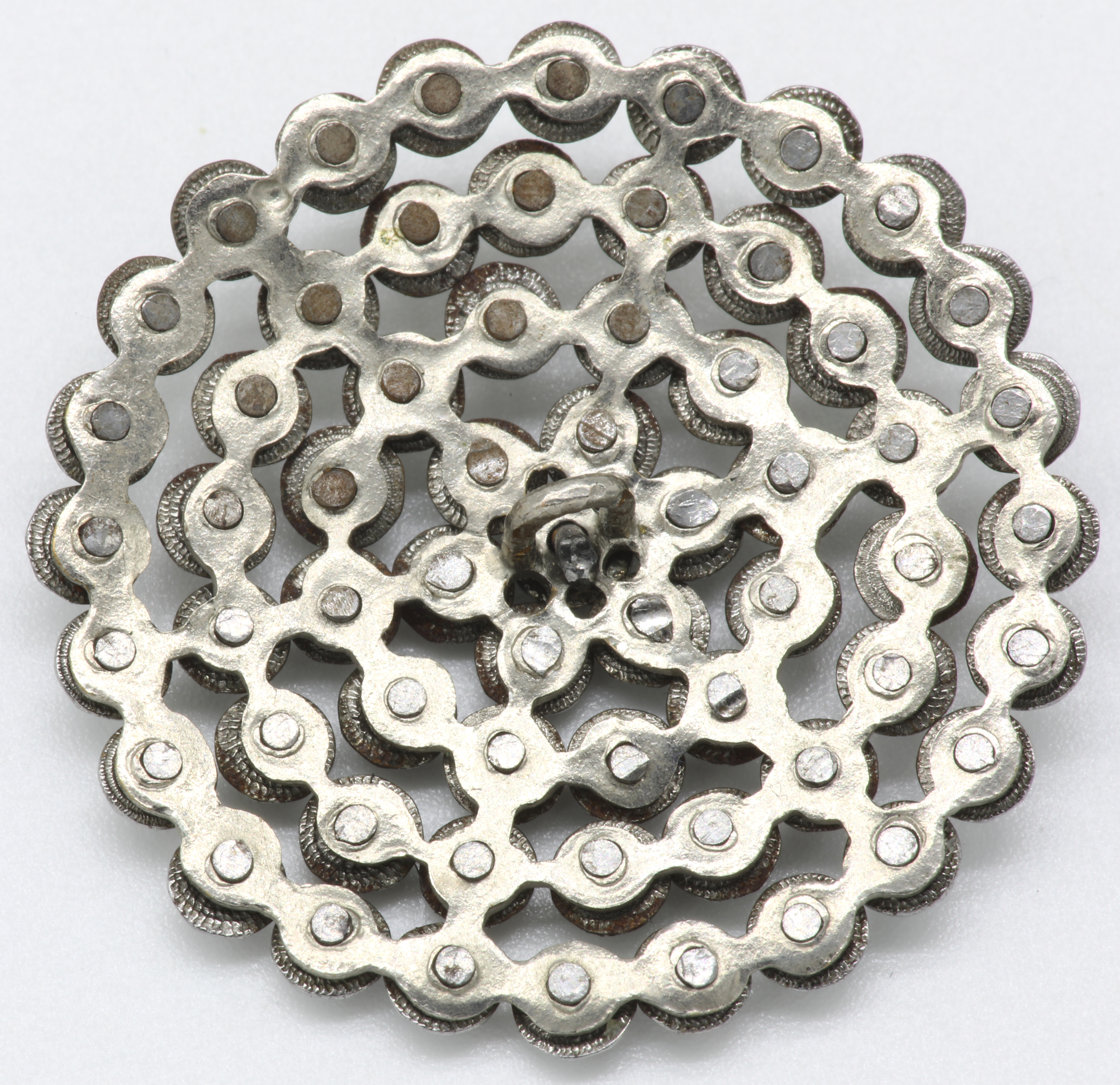
The back of a cut steel button

The basic design of cut steel jewellery is a thin metal baseplate onto which closely placed steel studs were riveted or screwed. The baseplate could be made from various metals such as brass, tin or silver alloys. Early cut steel consisted of individual steel studs that had been polished and inserted into metal frames. More complicated designs used multiple baseplates held together by small bits of metal. In the early 19th century the manufacturing process shifted towards using stamped strips in place of individual steel studs. The idea behind the design was that the polished steel faces would catch the light and sparkle in a similar way to the then highly fashionable diamonds.

The studs were made by forming them from steel and giving them a partial polish before case-hardening and giving them a final polish. Aside from the studs, some items of cut steel jewellery used highly polished steel chains in their design.

Cut steel was combined with precious and semi precious materials such as jet and pearls. Alternatively plaques of Jasperware and Bilston enamel feature in some designs. Plaques from further afield also appear to have been used with some appearing to come from Italy and Switzerland.

== History ==
It has been suggested that cut steel jewellery dates back as far as the 16th century. This is based on a single reference from 1598 and it is far from clear if it is talking about steel at all. Less ambiguous evidence shows that from around 1720 cut steel was manufactured in Woodstock, Oxfordshire. Exactly what was manufactured is poorly documented but by 1761 it included worn items such as buckles and watch chains as well as scissors. Exactly when purely decorative items first appeared is also unclear but "Stars for the nobility" are attested from 1778. Production in Birmingham became common latter in the century with Matthew Boulton being a prominent producer. The move away from Woodstock produced a switch from screwed studs to riveted studs. While the latter approach was cheaper it meant the jewellery could no longer be fully disassembled for cleaning. One of the major production items of 18th century cut steel was the shoe buckle and it is possible that the decline in the fashion for wearing buckles towards the end of the century drove the diversification of cut steel jewellery.

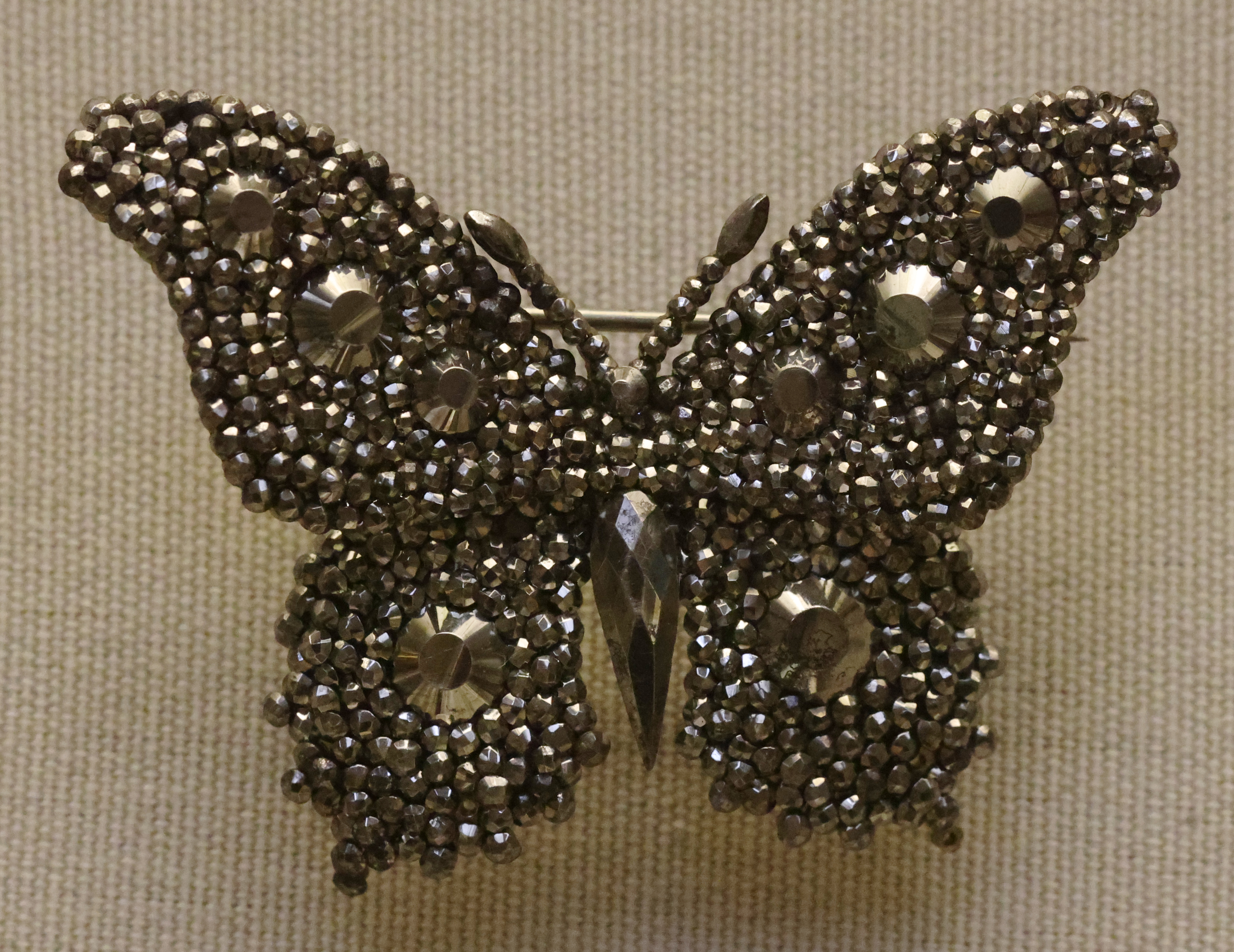
A cut steel hairpin

France served as a major export market but this was interrupted when war broke out 1793. The popularity of cut steel in France may in part have been due to sumptuary laws which limited who could wear precious metals and diamonds. Manufacture of cut steel within France is attested from 1780 and by the start of the 1820s France had a large amount of domestic production of cut steel. With the end of the Napoleonic wars British produces again started exporting to France. The fashion for cut steel jewellery in France was probably given a boost when Napoleon married his second wife Marie Louise and presented her with a parure consisting of cut steel jewellery as he was unable to afford one made with gemstones.

The quality and use of cut steel jewellery declined throughout the second half of the 19th century with stamped strips replacing individual rivets and pieces becoming increasingly flimsy, the final production ending in the 1930s.

Over the long term cut steel jewellery has proven brittle resulting in relatively small amounts surviving to the present day. Collections of cut steel jewellery are held by a number of museums including Lady Lever Art Gallery Birmingham Museums Trust and Musée des Beaux-Arts de Rouen. Matthew Bolton's pattern book has also survived in the collection of Birmingham Archives and Heritage.

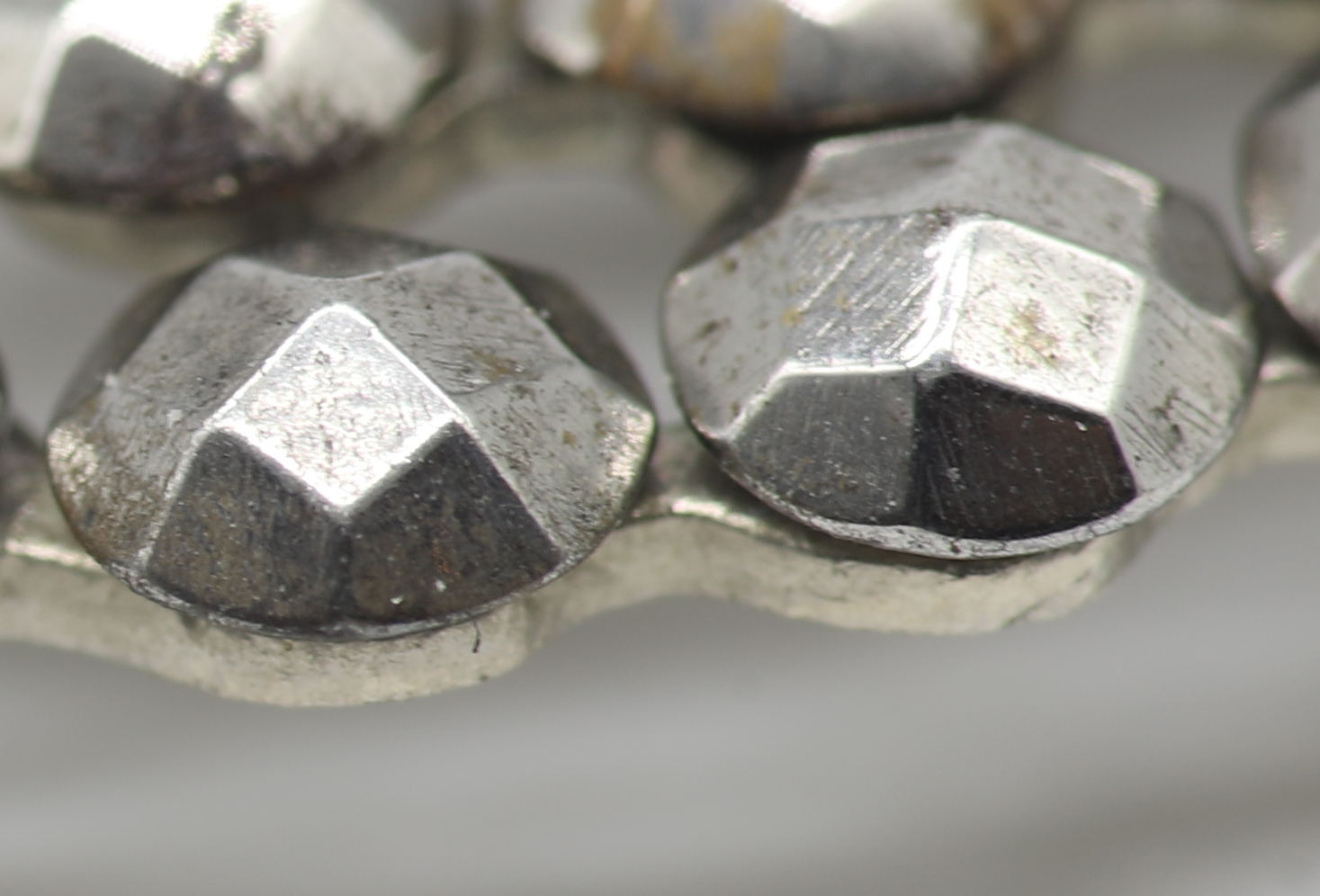
A pair of slightly rusty cut steel studs

== See also ==
- Berlin iron jewellery
- Marcasite jewellery
- The Swedish Royal Family's jewelry
