= Marcasite =

Iron disulfide (FeS2) with orthorhombic crystal structure

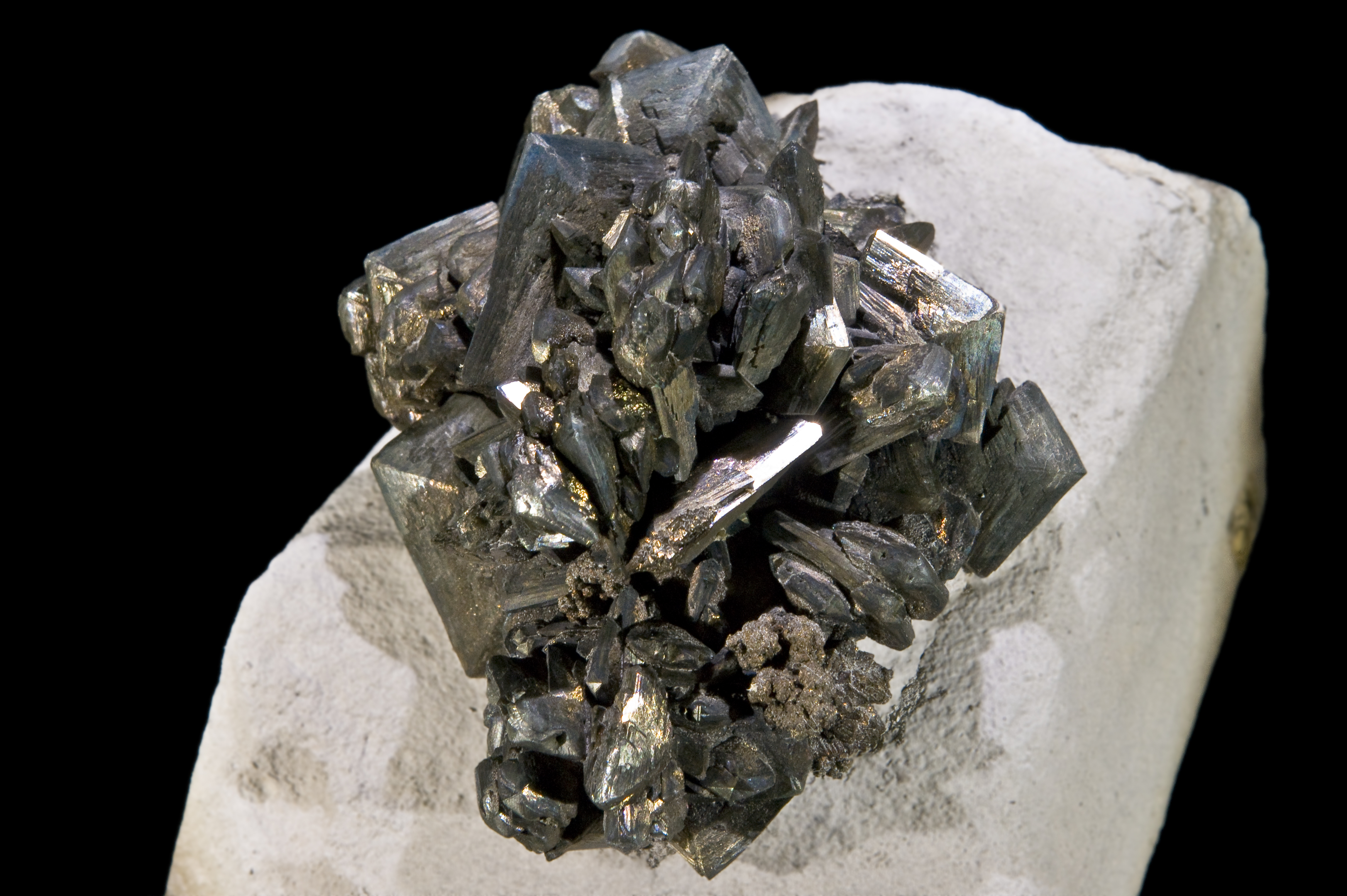
- Marcasite with tarnish (8×6 cm)

General
- Category: Sulfide mineral
- Formula: FeS_{2}
- IMA symbol: Mrc
- Strunz classification: 2.EB.10a
- Crystal system: Orthorhombic
- Crystal class: Dipyramidal (mmm); H-M symbol: (2/m 2/m 2/m)
- Space group: Pnnm
- Unit cell: a = 4.436 Å, b = 5.414 Å, c = 3.381 Å; Z = 2

Identification
- Formula mass: 119.98 g/mol
- Color: Tin-white on fresh surface, pale bronze-yellow, darkening on exposure, iridescent tarnish
- Crystal habit: Crystals typically tabular on {010}, curved faces common; stalactitic, reniform, massive; cockscomb and spearhead shapes due to twinning on {101}.
- Twinning: Common and repeated on {101}; less common on {011}.
- Cleavage: Cleavage: {101}, rather distinct; {110} in traces
- Fracture: Irregular/Uneven
- Tenacity: Brittle
- Mohs scale hardness: 6–6.5
- Luster: Metallic
- Streak: Dark-grey to black.
- Diaphaneity: Opaque
- Specific gravity: 4.875 calculated, 4.887 measured
- Pleochroism: [100] creamy white; [010] light yellowish white; [001] white with rose-brown tint. Anisotropism: Very strong, yellow through pale green to dark green

The mineral marcasite, sometimes called "white iron pyrite", is iron sulfide (FeS_{2}) with orthorhombic crystal structure. It is physically and crystallographically distinct from pyrite, which is iron sulfide with cubic crystal structure. Both structures contain the disulfide S_{2}^{2−} ion, having a short bonding distance between the sulfur atoms. The structures differ in how these di-anions are arranged around the Fe^{2+} cations. Marcasite is lighter and more brittle than pyrite. Specimens of marcasite often crumble and break up due to the unstable crystal structure.

On fresh surfaces, it is pale yellow to almost white and has a bright metallic luster. It tarnishes to a yellowish or brownish color and gives a black streak. It is a brittle material that cannot be scratched with a knife. The thin, flat, tabular crystals, when joined in groups, are called "cockscombs".

In the late medieval and early modern eras, the word "marcasite" meant all iron sulfides in general, including both pyrite and the mineral marcasite. The narrower, modern scientific definition for marcasite as specifically orthorhombic iron sulfide dates from 1845. Jewellery where pyrite is used as the gemstone is called marcasite jewellery; a term which pre-dates the scientific definition, using the original sense of the word. Marcasite in the scientific sense is not used as a gem due to its brittleness.

== Occurrence ==
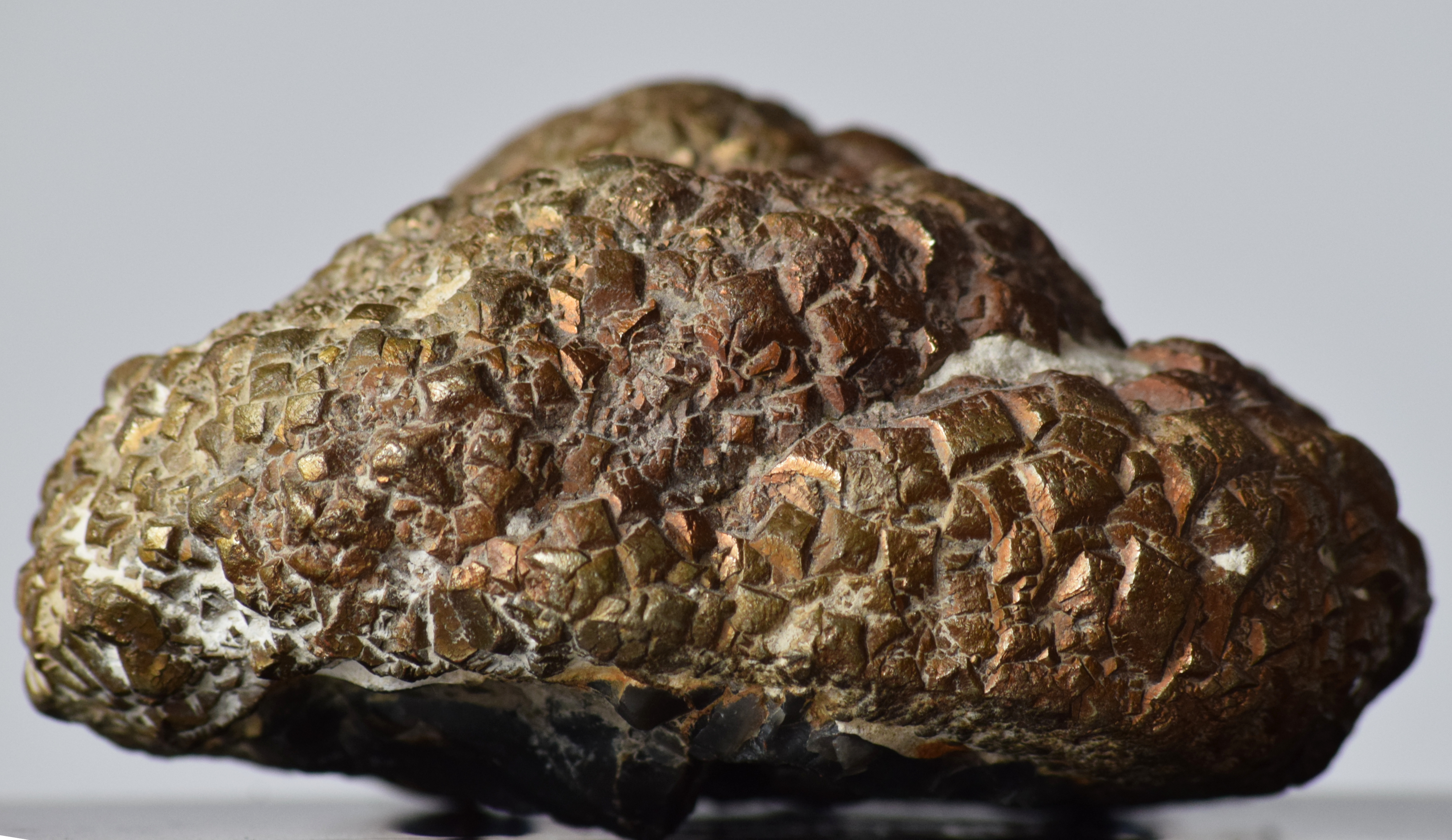
Massive aggregate (c. 9 × 7 × 5.5 cm) of marcasite from the steep coast near Kühlungsborn, Mecklenburg-West Pomerania, Germany

Marcasite can be formed as both a primary or a secondary mineral. It typically forms under low-temperature, highly acidic conditions. It occurs in sedimentary rocks (shales, limestones and low grade coals) as well as in low temperature hydrothermal veins. Commonly associated minerals include pyrite, pyrrhotite, galena, sphalerite, fluorite, dolomite, and calcite.

As a primary mineral marcasite forms nodules, concretions, and crystals in a variety of sedimentary rock, such as in the chalk layers found on both sides of the English Channel at Dover, Kent, England, and at Cap Blanc-Nez, Pas de Calais, France, where it forms as sharp individual crystals and crystal groups, and nodules (similar to those shown here). Marcasite is also found in complex sulphide deposits. In the Reocín mine, Cantabria, Spain, appears as crystals grouped in the form of cockscombs.

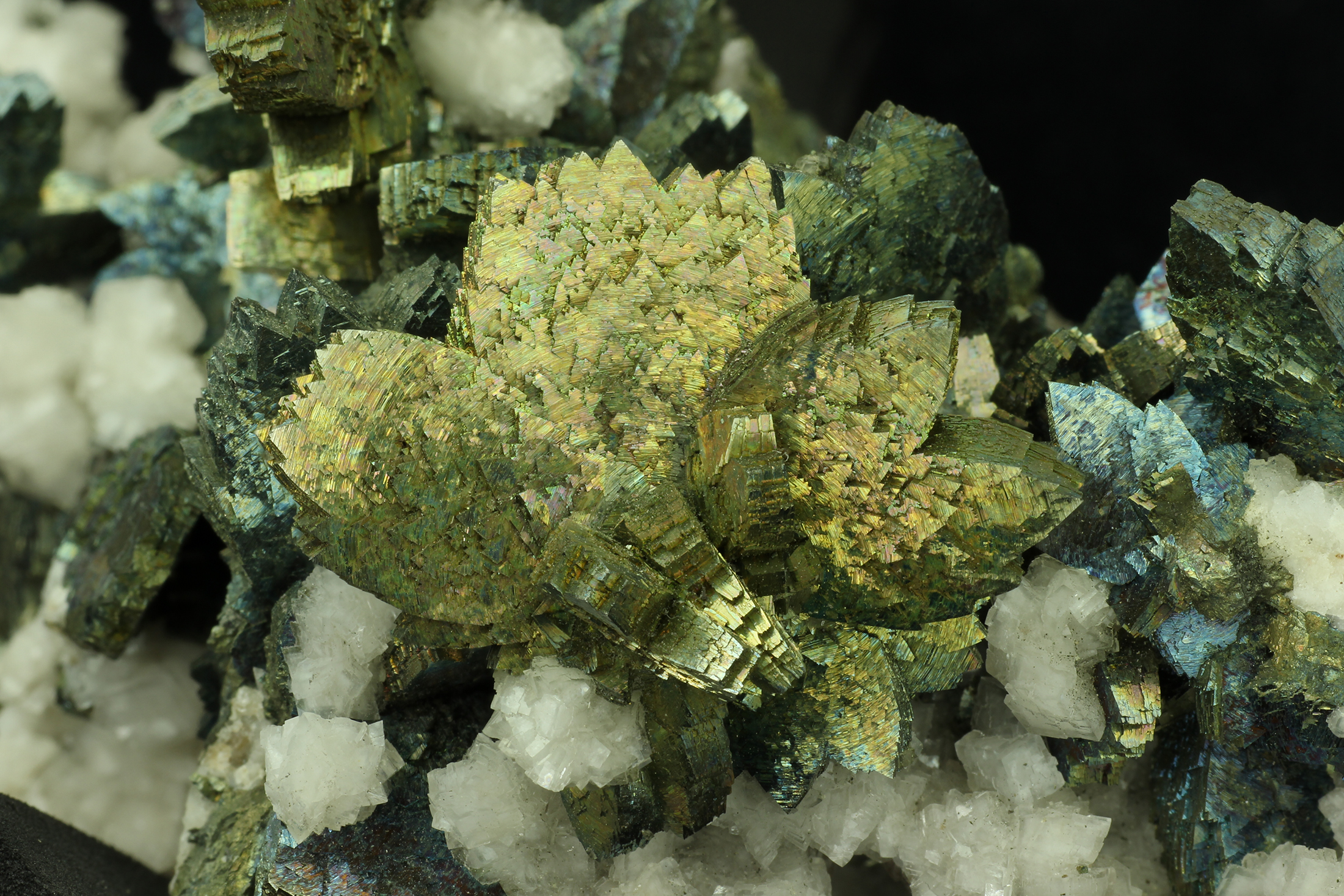
Marcasite crystals forming a cockscomb-shaped aggregate. Reocín Mine, Reocín, Cantabria (Spain).

As a secondary mineral, it forms by chemical alteration of a primary mineral, such as pyrrhotite or chalcopyrite.

=== Sedimentary marcasite and low pH ===
In laboratory experiments, marcasite forms preferentially to pyrite at a pH of less than about 5. Ab initio calculations suggest that this is due to pyrite having a higher surface energy (thus being less thermodynamically stable) than marcasite at low pH.

Due to the association of marcasite with low pH, the occurrence of marcasite in sedimentary rocks in the geologic record implies the presence of highly acidic conditions during the formation and early diagenesis of those rocks. However, sedimentary pore waters below the modern ocean are typically buffered at near-neutral to slightly alkaline pH by dissolved carbonate species. This raises the question of how sedimentary pore waters became sufficiently acidic to promote marcasite formation in the past.

Several theories have been proposed for the formation of early diagenetic marcasite, including: partial oxidation of primary pyrite by molecular oxygen infiltrating from the overlying water column, and rapid anoxic organic matter decomposition and organic acid generation by fermentation and methanogenesis.

== Varieties and blends ==
Blueite (S.H.Emmons): Nickel variety of marcasite, found in Denison Drury and Townships, Sudbury District, Ontario, Canada.

Lonchidite (August Breithaupt): Arsenic variety of marcasite, found at Churprinz Friedrich August Erbstolln Mine (Kurprinz Mine), Großschirma Freiberg, Ore Mountains, Saxony, Germany; ideal formula Fe(S, As)_{2}.

Synonyms for this variety:

- kausimkies,
- kyrosite,
- lonchandite,
- metalonchidite (Sandberger) described at Bernhard Mine near Hausach (Baden), Germany.

Sperkise: designates a marcasite having twin spearhead crystal on {101}. Sperkise derives from the German Speerkies (Speer meaning spear and Kies gravel or stone). This twin is very common in the marcasite of a chalky origin, particularly those from the Cap Blanc-Nez.

== Decay ==
Marcasite reacts more readily than pyrite under conditions of high humidity. The product of this disintegration is iron(II) sulfate and sulfuric acid. The hydrous iron sulfate forms a white powder consisting of the mineral melanterite, FeSO_{4}·7H_{2}O.

This disintegration of marcasite in mineral collections is known as "pyrite decay". When a specimen goes through pyrite decay, the marcasite reacts with moisture and oxygen in the air, the sulfur oxidizing and combining with water to produce sulfuric acid that attacks other sulfide minerals and mineral labels. Low humidity (less than 60%) storage conditions prevents or slows the reaction.

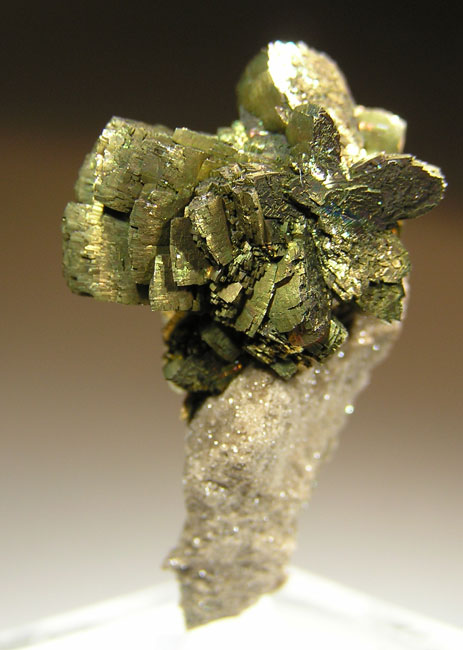
Iridescent cluster of marcasite crystals (3.3 × 2.1 × 1.4 cm)

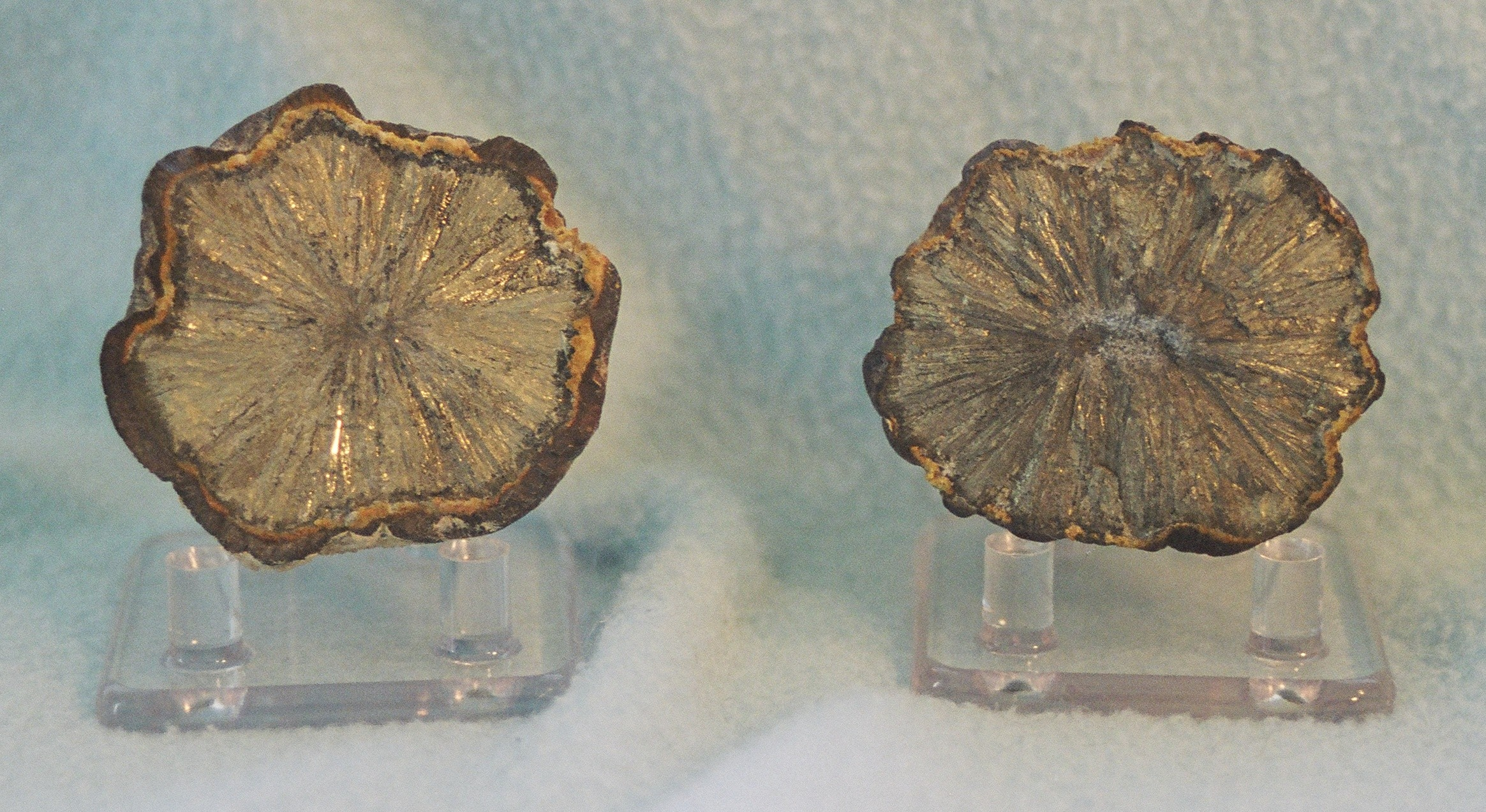
Two halves of a ball of marcasite geode from France

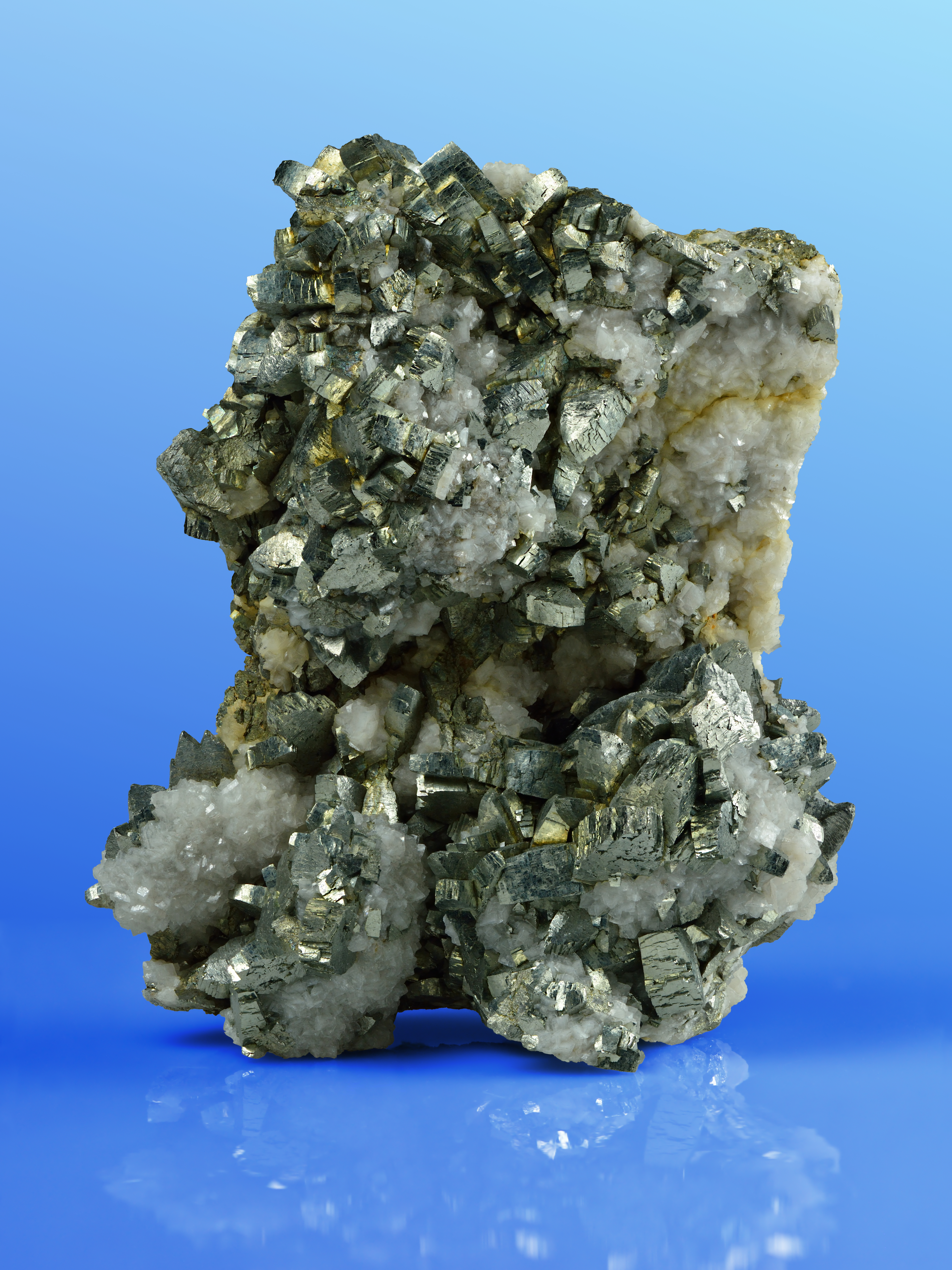
Marcasite with dolomite
