= One, Two, Buckle My Shoe =

English-language nursery rhyme

- by Traditional
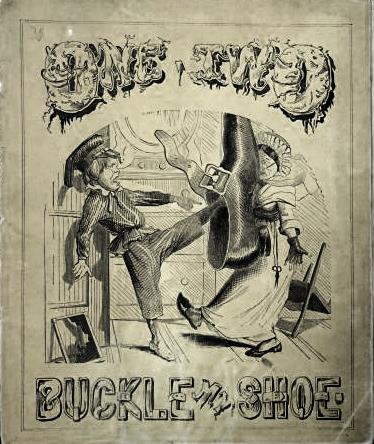
- Augustus Hoppin's illustration, published in New York, 1866
- Genre: Nursery rhyme
- Publication date: 1805

"One, Two, Buckle My Shoe" is a popular English language nursery rhyme and counting-out rhyme of which there are early occurrences in the US and UK. It has a Roud Folk Song Index number of 11284.

== Rhyme ==
A common version is given in The Oxford Dictionary of Nursery Rhymes:

One, two, buckle my shoe;
Three, four, knock at the door;
Five, six, pick up sticks;
Seven, eight, lay them straight;
Nine, ten, a big fat hen;
Eleven, twelve, dig and delve;
Thirteen, fourteen, maids a-courting;
Fifteen, sixteen, maids in the kitchen;
Seventeen, eighteen, maids in waiting;
Nineteen, twenty, my plate's empty.

Other sources give differing lyrics.

== Origins and variations ==
In his The Counting-Out Rhymes of Children (1888), the American collector of folklore, Henry Carrington Bolton (1843–1903), quoted an old lady who remembered a longer version of this rhyme as being used in Wrentham, Massachusetts as early as 1780. Beyond the first four lines, it proceeded:

Nine, ten, kill a fat hen;
Eleven, twelve, bake it well;
Thirteen, fourteen, go a-courtin;
Fifteen, sixteen, go to milkin’;
Seventeen, eighteen, do the bakin’;
Nineteen, twenty, the mill is empty;
Twenty-one, change the gun;
Twenty-two, the partridge flew;
Twenty-three, she lit on a tree;
Twenty-four, she lit down lower….
Twenty-nine, the game is mine;
Thirty, make a kerchy.

Some of the final lines Bolton's informant could no longer remember.

In the UK the rhyme was first recorded in Songs for the Nursery, published in London in 1805. This version differed beyond the number twelve, with the lyrics:

Thirteen, fourteen, draw the curtain,
Fifteen sixteen, the maid's in the kitchen,
Seventeen, eighteen, she's in waiting,
Nineteen, twenty, my stomach's empty.

A version published five years later in Gammer Gurton's Garland (1810) was titled "Arithmetick" and had the following different lines:

Three, four, lay down lower;
Eleven twelve, who will delve;
Fifteen, sixteen, maids a-kissing;
Nineteen, twenty, my belly's empty.

In 1842, James Orchard Halliwell recorded "Shut the door" at the close of the second line.

== Illustrated publications ==
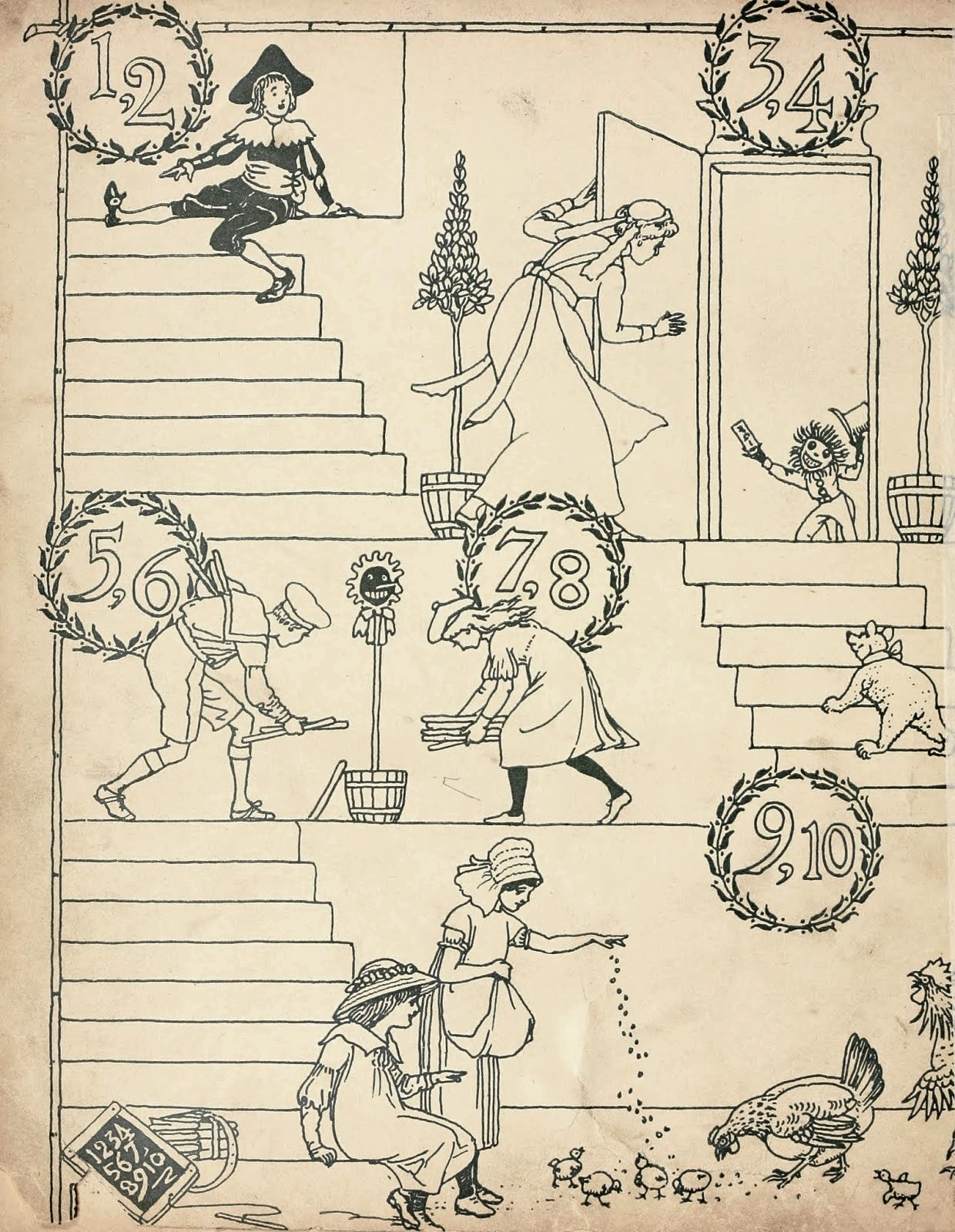
An 1869 endpaper by Walter Crane

The rhyme was sometimes published alone in illustrated editions. That with lithographs by Caroline R. Baillie (Edinburgh, 1857) had an oblong format showing domestic 18th-century interiors. There were also two editions of the rhyme published from London, both illustrated by Walter Crane. The first was a single volume picture-book (John Lane, 1869) with end-papers showing a composite of the 1 – 10 sequence and of the 11 – 20 sequence. It was followed in 1910 by The Buckle My Shoe Picture Book, containing other rhymes too. This had coloured full-page illustrations: composites for lines 1-2 and 3–4, and then one for each individual line.

In America, the rhyme was used to help young people learn to count and was also individually published. Among these, the distinctive illustrations by Courtland Hoppin (1834–1876) devoted to each verse first appeared in editions published at the end of 1866. In Old Mother Goose's Rhymes And Tales (London and New York, 1889) there was only a single page given to the rhyme, illustrated by Constance Haslewood in the style of Kate Greenaway.

In 2023, a parodied version of the song was popularised as an internet meme. In this variation, the lyrics are:

(They're the brand-new...)
One, two, buckle my shoe;
Three, four, buckle some more;
Five, six, Nike kicks.
