= Marcasite jewellery =

Polished pieces of pyrite jewellery

Marcasite

General
- Category: Minerals

Identification
- Color: Silver/Grey

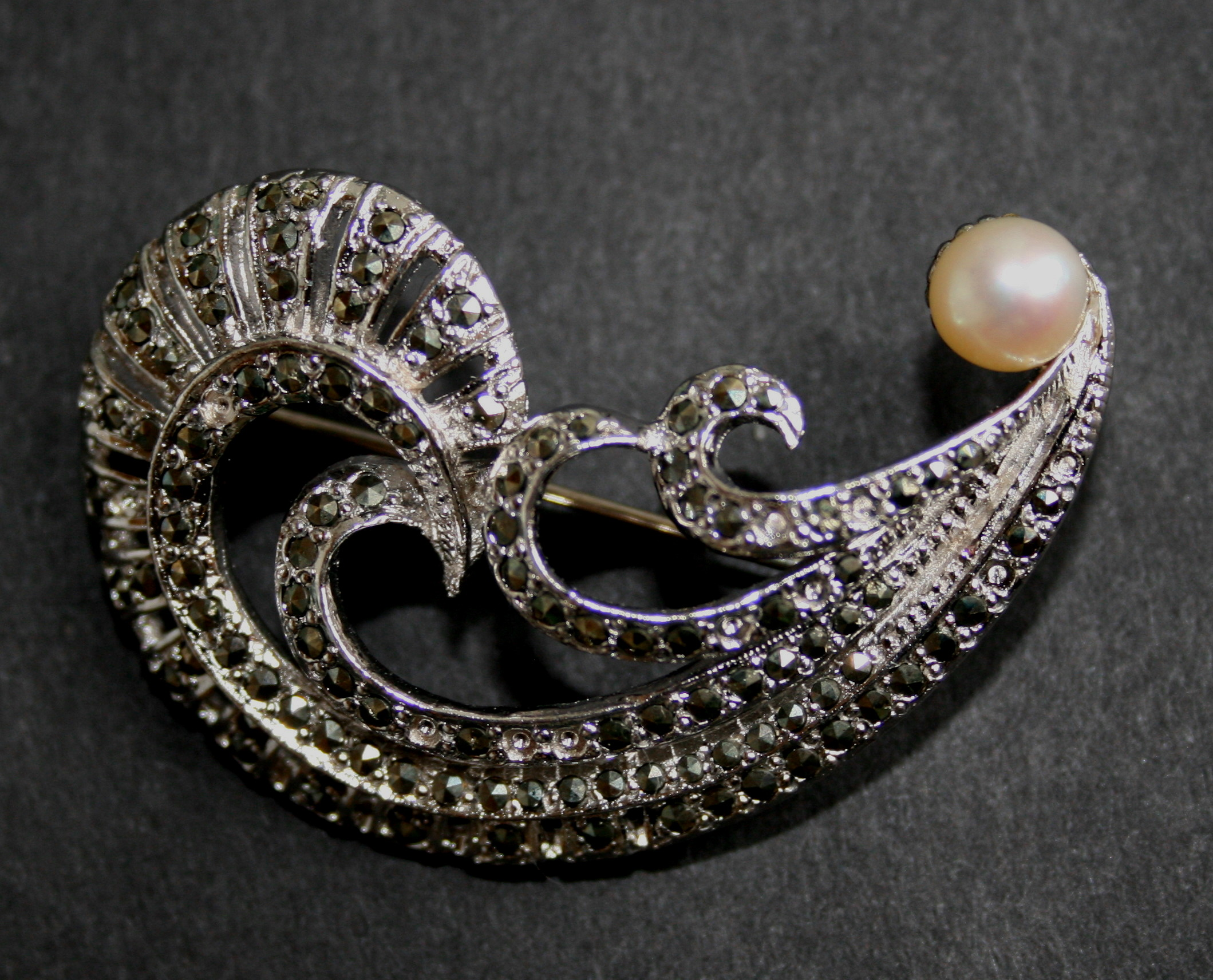
Marcasite brooch made from pyrite and silver

Marcasite jewellery is jewellery made using cut and polished pieces of pyrite (fool's gold) as a gemstone, and not, as the name suggests, from marcasite.

Both pyrite and marcasite are chemically iron sulfide, but differ in their crystal structures, giving them different physical properties. Pyrite is more stable and less brittle than marcasite. Marcasite can also react with moisture to form sulfuric acid. These are the reasons why pyrite is used instead of real marcasite in "marcasite" jewellery.

Marcasite jewellery is frequently made by setting small pieces of faceted pyrite into silver. Cheaper costume jewellery is made by gluing pieces of pyrite rather than setting. A similar-looking type of jewellery can be made from small pieces of cut steel. The cut and polished marcasite pieces reflect light at different angles from its different facets giving it a sparkle.

Thailand is one of the large producers of modern marcasite jewellery in silver.

== History ==
Marcasite jewellery has been made since the time of the ancient Greeks. It was particularly popular in the eighteenth century, the Victorian era and with Art Nouveau jewellery designers. When diamonds were banned from public display in Switzerland in the 18th century, marcasite, along with cut steel, was turned to as a replacement.

When Prince Albert died in 1861, Queen Victoria entered a period of mourning, requiring her entire court to wear black and avoid opulent jewellery. Marcasite became popular as an understated alternative for the nobility.
