= Potassium dithioferrate =

Identifiers
CAS Number	12022-42-3
3D model (JSmol)	Interactive image
ChemSpider	23621924
- InChI: InChI=1S/Fe.K.2S/q-1;+1;; Key: YILQDQXZSLGNAV-UHFFFAOYSA-N
- SMILES: S=[Fe-]=S.[K+]

Properties
Chemical formula	FeKS_{2}
Molar mass	159.06 g·mol^{−1}
Appearance	dark purple solid
- Except where otherwise noted, data are given for materials in their standard state (at 25 °C [77 °F], 100 kPa). Infobox references

Potassium dithioferrate is the inorganic compound with the formula KFeS_{2}. It is a purple solid that is insoluble in water. Regarding its chemical structure, the compound consists of infinite chains of edge-shared anionic FeS_{4} tetrahedra. Associated with these chains are potassium ions. A related family of one-dimensional materials exists with the formula MFe_{2}S_{3} (M = K, Rb, Cs). These mixed-valence compounds are represented by the mineral rasvumite, KFe_{2}S_{3}.

The compound is prepared by heating iron powder, sulfur, and potassium carbonate at 900 °C. According to the idealized stoichiometry, this reaction is proposed to cogenerate potassium sulfate:

6 Fe + 13 S + 4 K_{2}CO_{3} → 6 KFeS_{2} + K_{2}SO_{4} + 4 CO_{2}
