= Knee buckling =

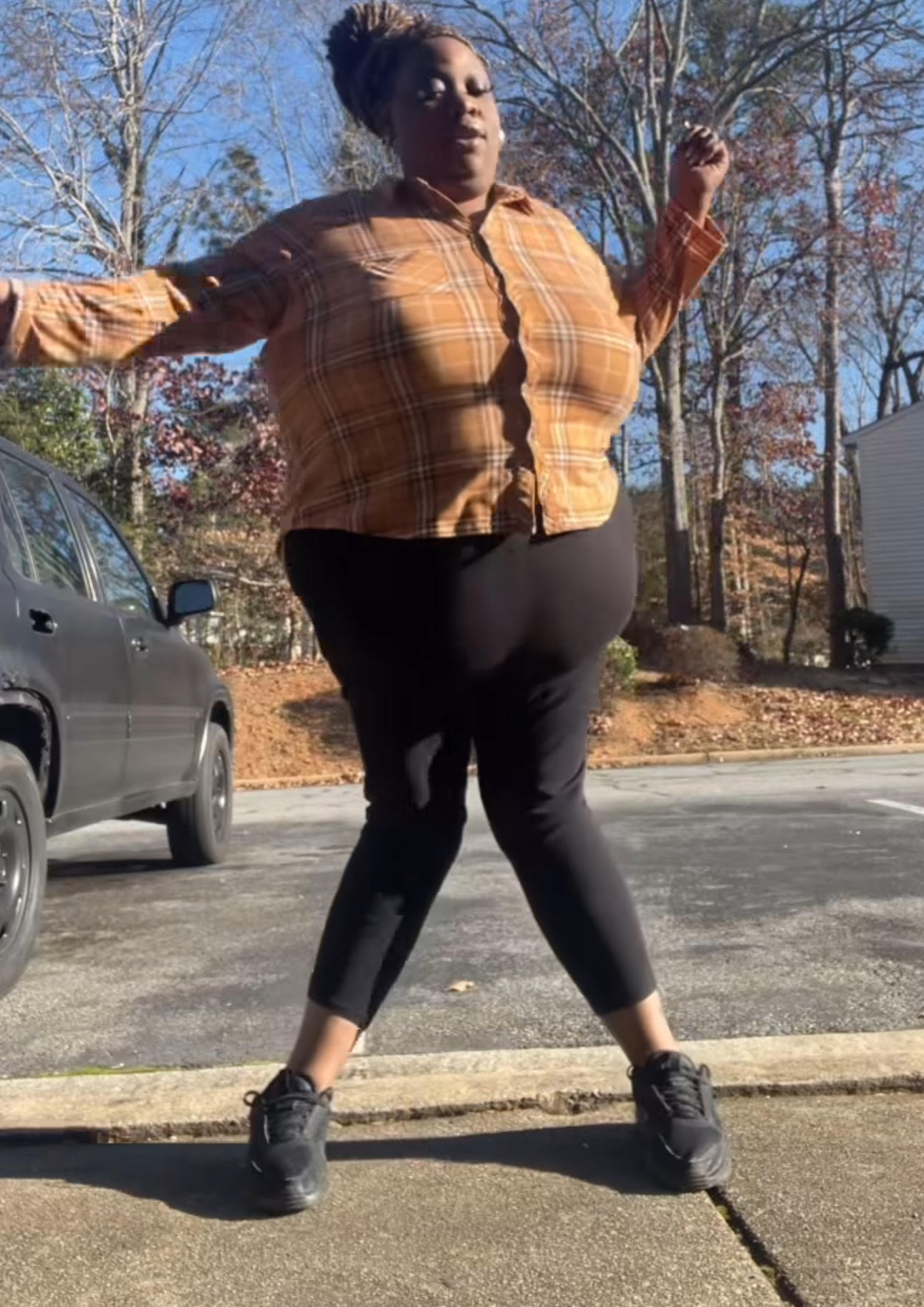
- Differential diagnosis: knee instability

Knee buckling is a symptom of knee instability that frequently affects older individuals, especially when putting weight on the knees.
