= Birmingham Archives and Heritage =

Public library in Birmingham

Coordinates: 52°28′47″N 1°54′30″W

Birmingham Archives and Collections at the Library of Birmingham hold the archives for the city of Birmingham, England. The records date back to the 12th century and are accessible for multiple levels of research, from family histories to a wider range of historical interest of the area.

== Women's history records ==
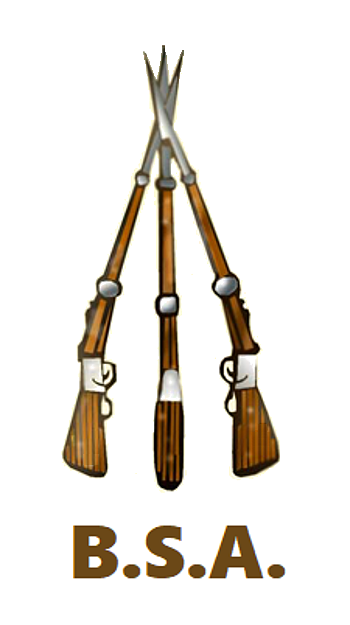
The trademark of Birmingham Small Arms, records of which are held at the archive.

The archives hold a number of specialist collections relating to women's history such as records relating to Suffragism in Birmingham, including records relating to Winson Green Prison where force feeding of women on hunger strike was first carried out. Also held are records relating to women's lives during the Second World War such as those of the female munitions workers at Birmingham Small Arms and John Lucas Ltd. Women's health is dealt with in a number of collections, such as the journal of T.A. Finigan, an Irish Priest, which deals with women of the Irish community in Birmingham, or the records of the Birmingham Association for the Unmarried Mother and Her Child (c.1906–1976).
