= Shoe buckle =

Fashion accessory

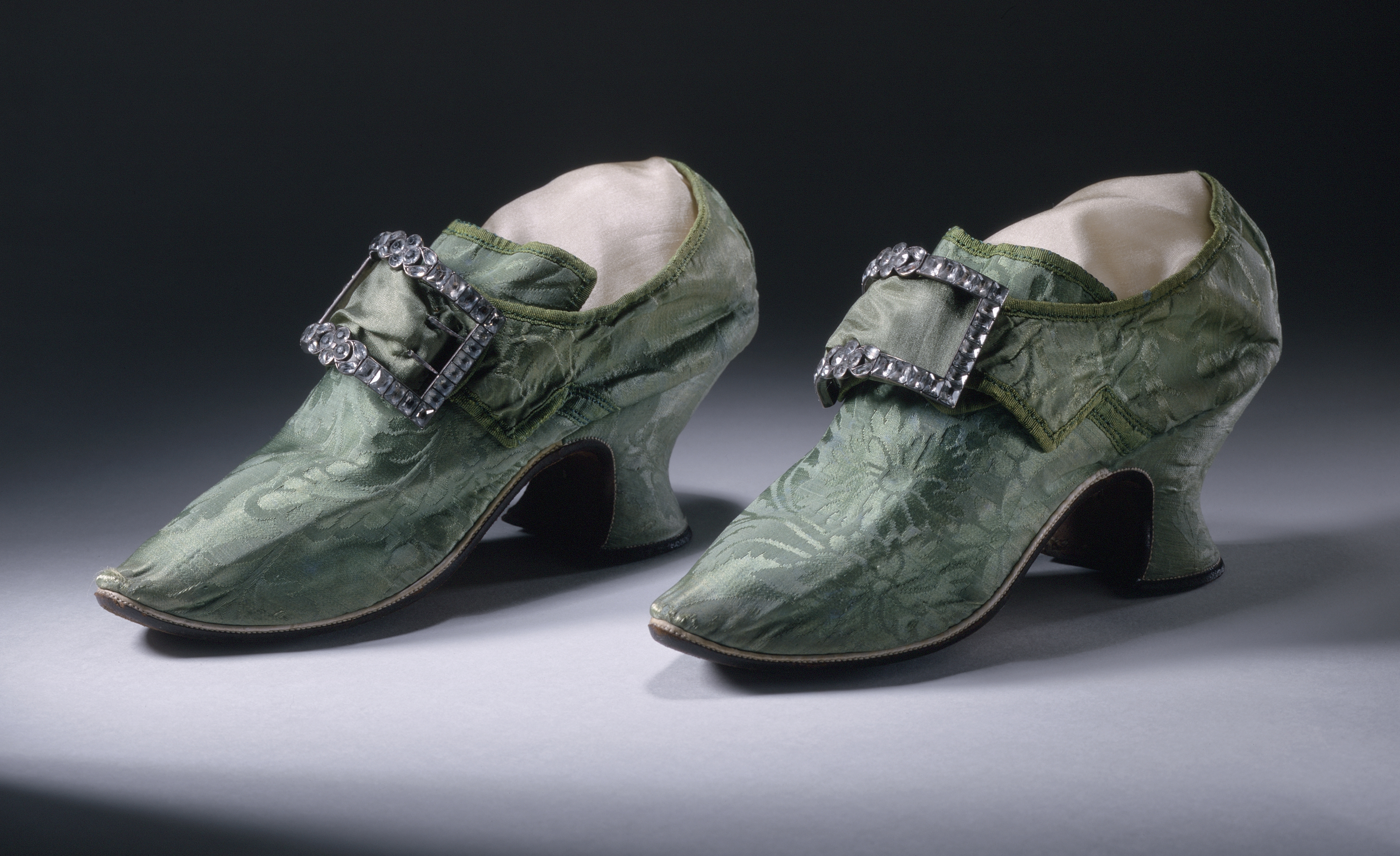
Woman's silk damask shoes with buckles, 1740–1750, England. Los Angeles County Museum of Art, M.81.71.1a-b.

Shoe buckles are fashion accessories worn by men and women from the mid-17th century through the 18th century to the 19th century. Shoe buckles were made of a variety of materials including brass, steel, silver or silver gilt, and buckles for formal wear were set with diamonds, quartz or imitation jewels.

== History ==
Buckled shoes began to replace tied shoes in the mid-17th century: Samuel Pepys wrote in his Diary for 22 January 1660 "This day I began to put on buckles to my shoes, which I have bought yesterday of Mr. Wotton." The fashion at first remained uncommon enough though that even in 1693 a writer to a newspaper complained of the new fashion of buckles replacing ribbons for fastening shoes and knee bands. Separate buckles remained fashionable until they were abandoned along with high-heeled footwear and other aristocratic fashions in the years after the French Revolution, although they were retained as part of ceremonial and court dress until well into the 20th century. In Britain in 1791 an attempt was made by buckle manufactures to stop the change in fashion by appealing to the then Prince of Wales Prince George. While the prince did start to require them for his court, this did not stop the decline of the shoe buckle. It has been suggested that the decline drove the manufacturers of steel buckles to diversify into producing a range of cut steel jewellery.

King Charles III wore shoe buckles at his coronation in 2023; the buckles were made by silversmith Clive Burr and commissioned by the London Goldsmiths Company.

== Knee buckle ==
Knee buckles are used to fasten the knee-high boots just below the level of the knee.

== Gallery ==
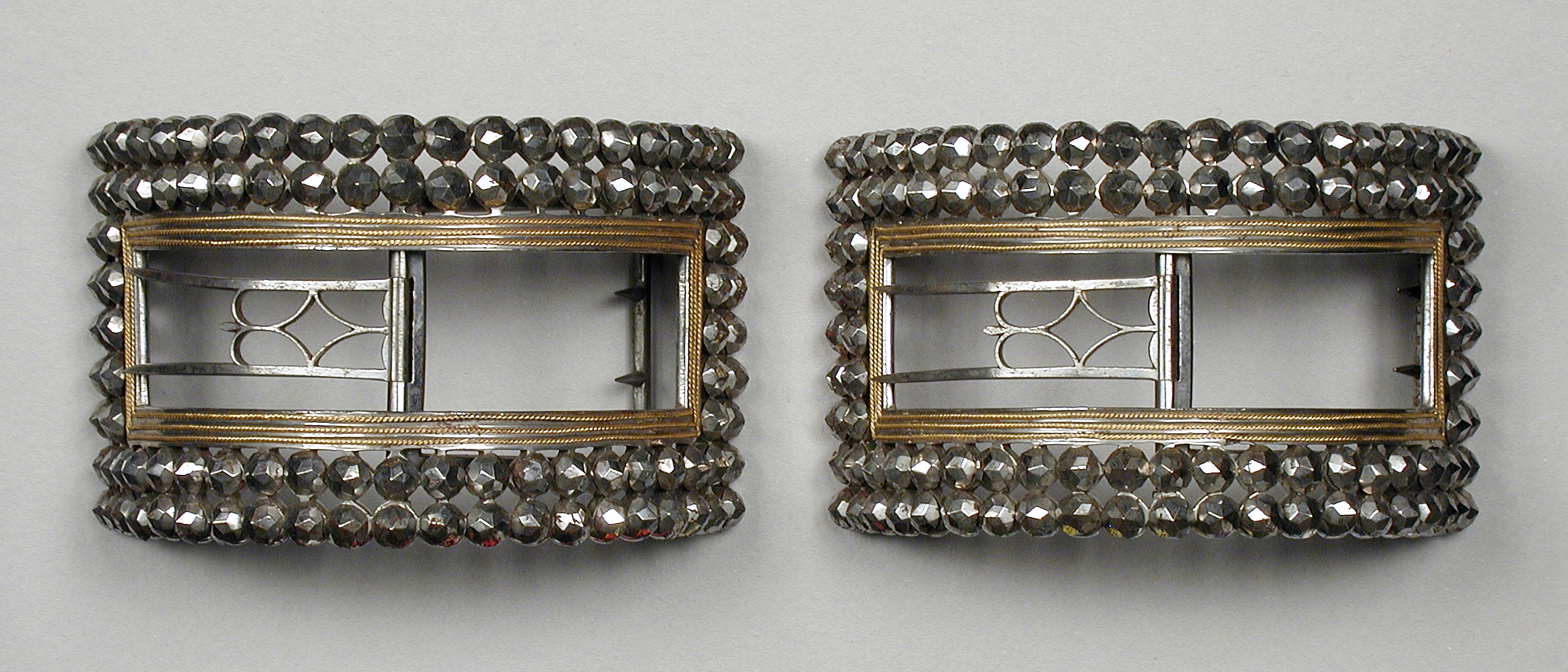
Man's steel and gilt wire shoe buckles, England, c. 1777–1785 LACMA M.80.92.6a-b.

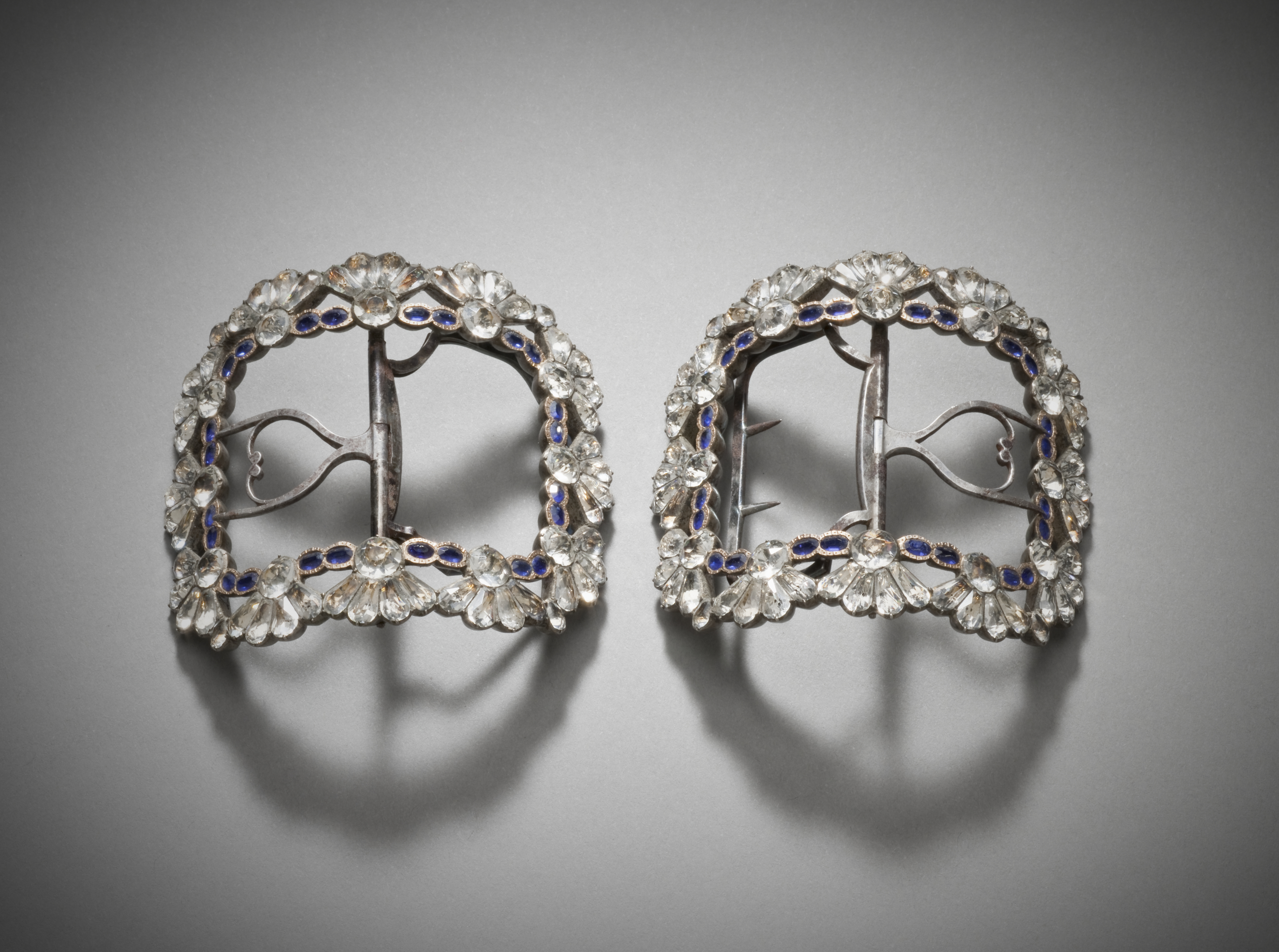
Woman's silver and steel shoe buckles with paste stones, 1780–1785. LACMA M.80.92.1a-b

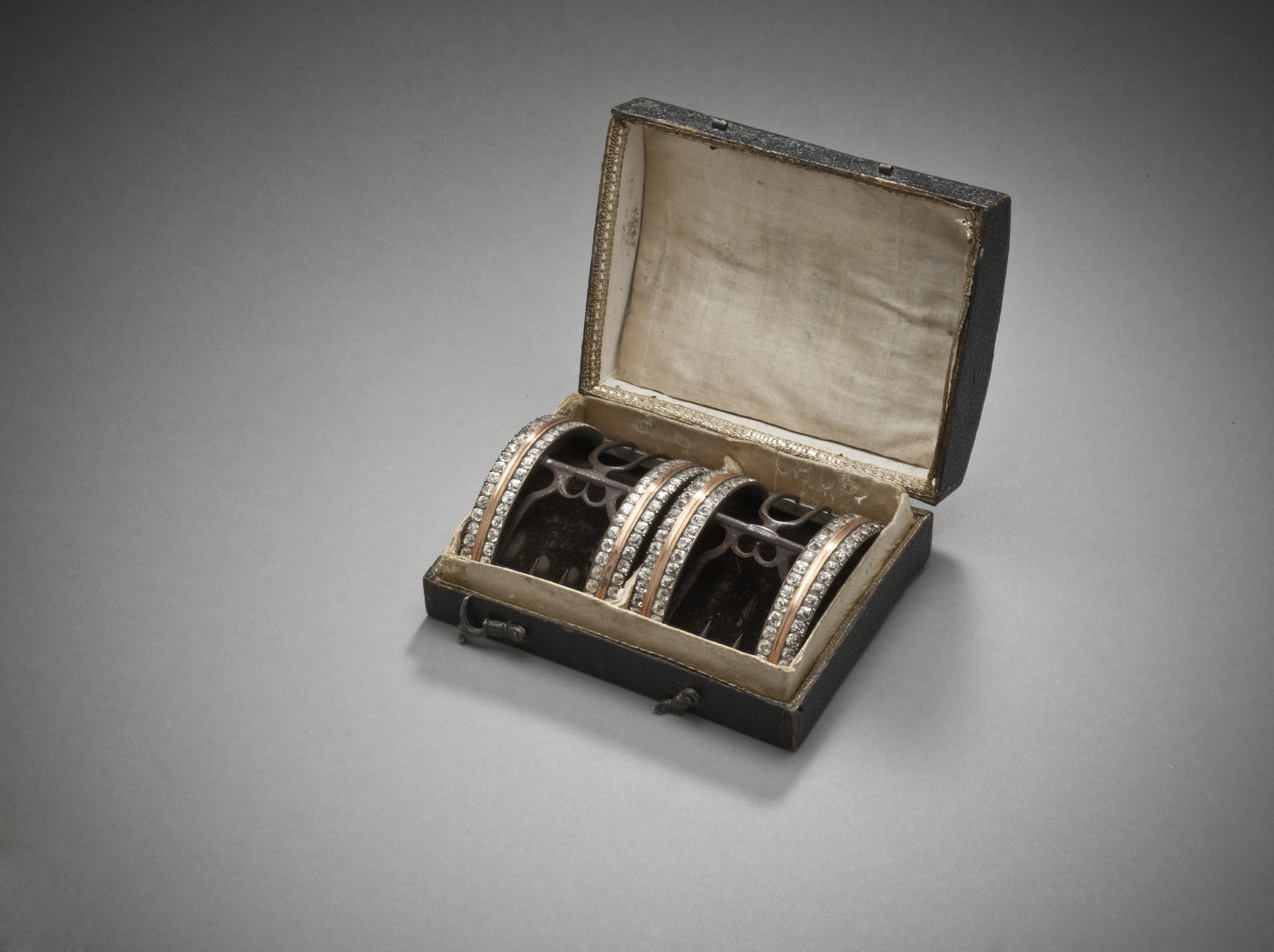
Man's shoe buckles with case. Paste stones with gilded-copper-alloy trim on silver and steel, France, c. 1785. LACMA M.2007.211.829a-b.

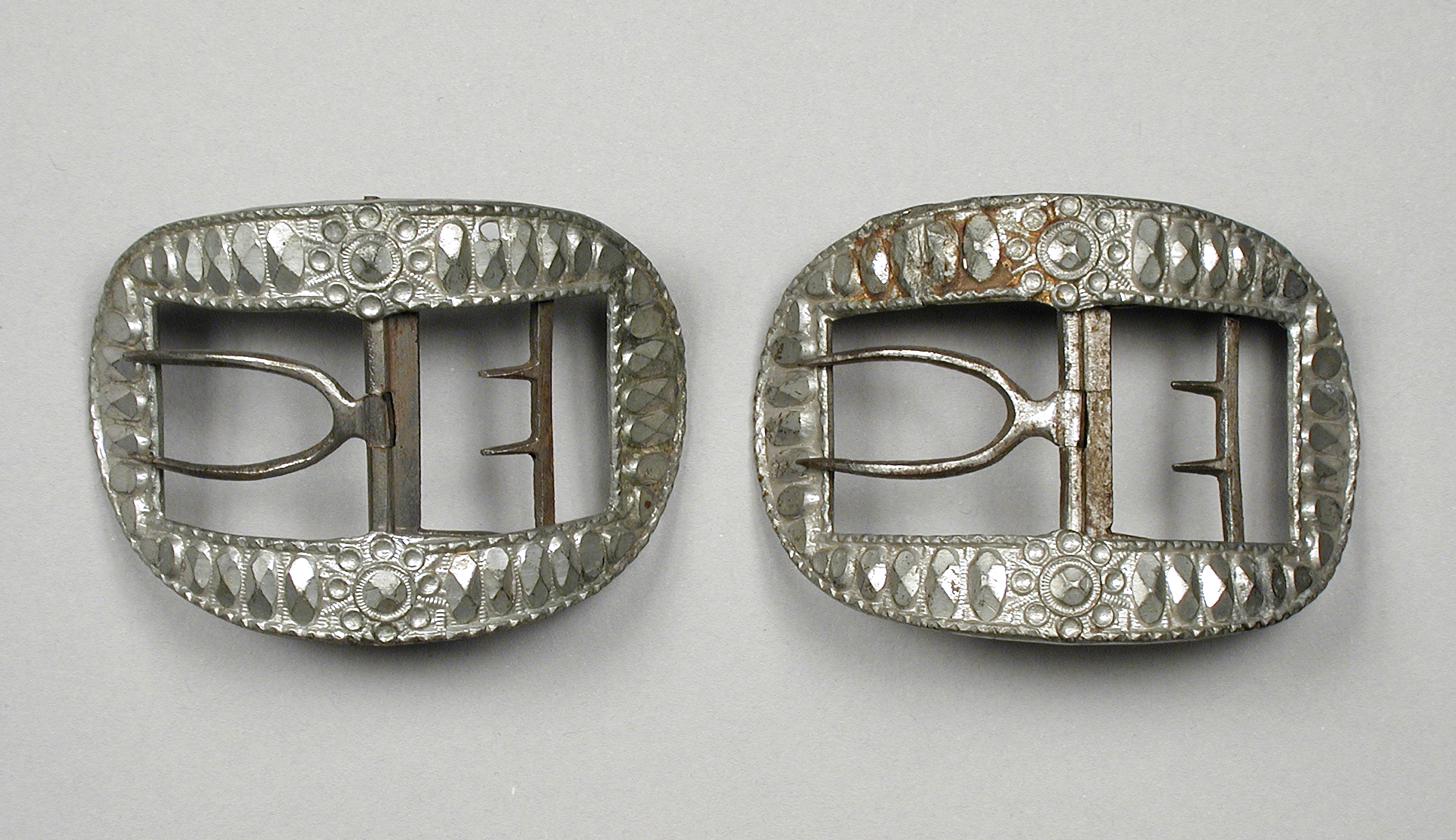
Man's cut steel shoe buckles, United States, 1780s. LACMA 42.16.23a-b.

== See also ==
- One, Two, Buckle My Shoe
- 1700–1750 in fashion
- 1750–1775 in fashion
- 1775–1795 in fashion
