= VO2+ =

VO2+ may refer to:

- Vanadyl (VO^{2+})
- Pervanadyl (VO^{+}_{2})
