= Niobium(V) oxynitrate =

Names
- Other names: Niobyl nitrate; Niobium oxytrinitrate

Identifiers
CAS Number	100456-47-1
3D model (JSmol)	Interactive image
EC Number	623-412-8
- InChI: InChI=1S/3NO3.Nb.O/c3*2-1(3)4;;/q3*-1;+3; Key: XWRVJMHGWNZEAR-UHFFFAOYSA-N
- SMILES: [Nb](O[N+]([O-])=O)(O[N+]([O-])=O)(O[N+]([O-])=O)=O

Properties
Chemical formula	NbO(NO_{3})_{3}
Molar mass	294.92 g/mol
Appearance	White solid
Melting point	120 °C (248 °F; 393 K) (decomposes)
Solubility in water	Reacts
Solubility	Slightly soluble in diethyl ether, MeCN, and benzene

Structure
Crystal structure	Tetragonal

Hazards
- GHS labelling
Pictograms	(GHS03: Oxidizing) (GHS07: Exclamation mark)
Signal word	Danger
Hazard statements	H272, H315, H319, H335

Related compounds
Other anions	Niobium oxychloride
Other cations	Vanadyl nitrate
- Except where otherwise noted, data are given for materials in their standard state (at 25 °C [77 °F], 100 kPa). Infobox references

Niobium(V) oxynitrate is an inorganic compound with the proposed formula NbO(NO_{3})_{3}.

A single publication claims that niobium pentachloride and dinitrogen pentoxide react in anhydrous nitric acid at 30 °C to give niobium(V) oxynitrate and a nitryl chloride byproduct:

NbCl_{5} + 4N_{2}O_{5} → NbO(NO_{3})_{3} + 5NO_{2}Cl

The synthesis is quite solvent-dependent. The same reagents in acetonitrile instead form a (acetonitrile)niobium(V) dioxynitrate complex.
