= ClO2 =

ClO2 may refer to:

- Chlorine dioxide (ClO_{2}), an explosive gas
- Chlorite (ClO^{−}_{2}), a chlorine oxyanion
- Chloryl (ClO^{+}_{2}), a rare example of an oxycation
