= Oxycation =

Positively charged polyatomic ion containing oxygen

An oxycation, or oxocation, is an ion with the generic formula A_{x}O^{z+}_{y} (where A represents a chemical element and O represents an oxygen atom). Their names normally end with the suffix "-ium" or "-yl". (Note: However, the International Union of Pure and Applied Chemistry standard book on nomenclature of inorganic chemistry does not mention "oxycation". Union internationale de chimie pure et appliquée, ed. (2005). Nomenclature of inorganic chemistry: IUPAC recommendations 2005 (PDF). Cambridge: Royal society of chemistry. ISBN 978-0-85404-438-2.)

== Isolable oxycations ==
Structural details of the acetyl cation.

A few salts of oxycations have been reported. They are all associated with lighter main group elements. The nitrogen-containing cations are NO^{+} and NO^{+}_{2}. The latter is the active species in nitration reactions.

The Friedel-Crafts reaction is a classical organic reaction for attachment of acyl groups to arenes. The active acylating agent is often an acylium ion, several of which have been isolated..

== Oxycation nomenclature ==
=== Main group species ===
- NO^{+} - example: nitrosyl tetrafluoroborate
- NO^{+}_{2} - example: nitronium tetrafluoroborate
- ClO^{+}_{2} - example: chloryl hexafluororuthenate

More-complex oxycations include species like SOF_{3}^{+}. Aluminyl, antimonyl, and bismuthyl derivatives more closely resemble the situation for transition metal oxy cations in the sense that they are bonded to many Lewis bases. The cation [Bi_{6}(O)_{4}(OH)_{4}]^{6+}, a face-capped octahedral cluster, is one example.

=== Transition metal species ===
Many transition compounds that contain an oxo ligand can be viewed as salts of a hypothetical "oxycation." In condensed phase, they are always complexed with strong Lewis bases.

- TiO^{2+} - example: titanyl sulfate, Ti(O)SO_{4}(H_{2}O).
- VO^{3+} - example: vanadium oxytrichloride, a.k.a. vanadyl chloride, VOCl_{3}>
- VO^{2+} - example: vanadyl phosphate, VO(HPO_{4})
- CrO_{2}^{2+} - example: chromyl chloride, CrO_{2}Cl_{2}
- MoO^{3+} - molybdenyl chloride, MoOCl_{3}.
- FeO^{2+} - examples include many ferryl intermediates

=== Actinide species ===
- PaO^{3+}
- UO^{+}_{2}, NpO^{+}_{2}, PuO^{+}_{2}, AmO^{+}_{2}
- UO^{2+}_{2}, NpO^{2+}_{2}, PuO^{2+}_{2}, AmO^{2+}_{2}

== Oxycations in the gas-phase ==
While species like vanadyl (VO^{2+} and VO^{3+}) do not exist in solution, some oxycations can be generated in the vacuum chamber of mass spectrometers. Using ion cyclotron resonance, these oxycations have been shown to react even with simple hydrocarbons, attesting to the high reactivity.

== See also ==
- Oxyanion
- List of aqueous ions by element
