= Vanadium redox battery =

Type of rechargeable flow battery

- Specific energy: 10–20 Wh/kg (36–72 J/g)
- Energy density: 15–25 Wh/L (54–90 kJ/L)
- Energy efficiency: 75–90%
- Time durability: 20 years
- Cycle durability: >12,000–14,000 cycles
- Nominal cell voltage: 1.15–1.55 V

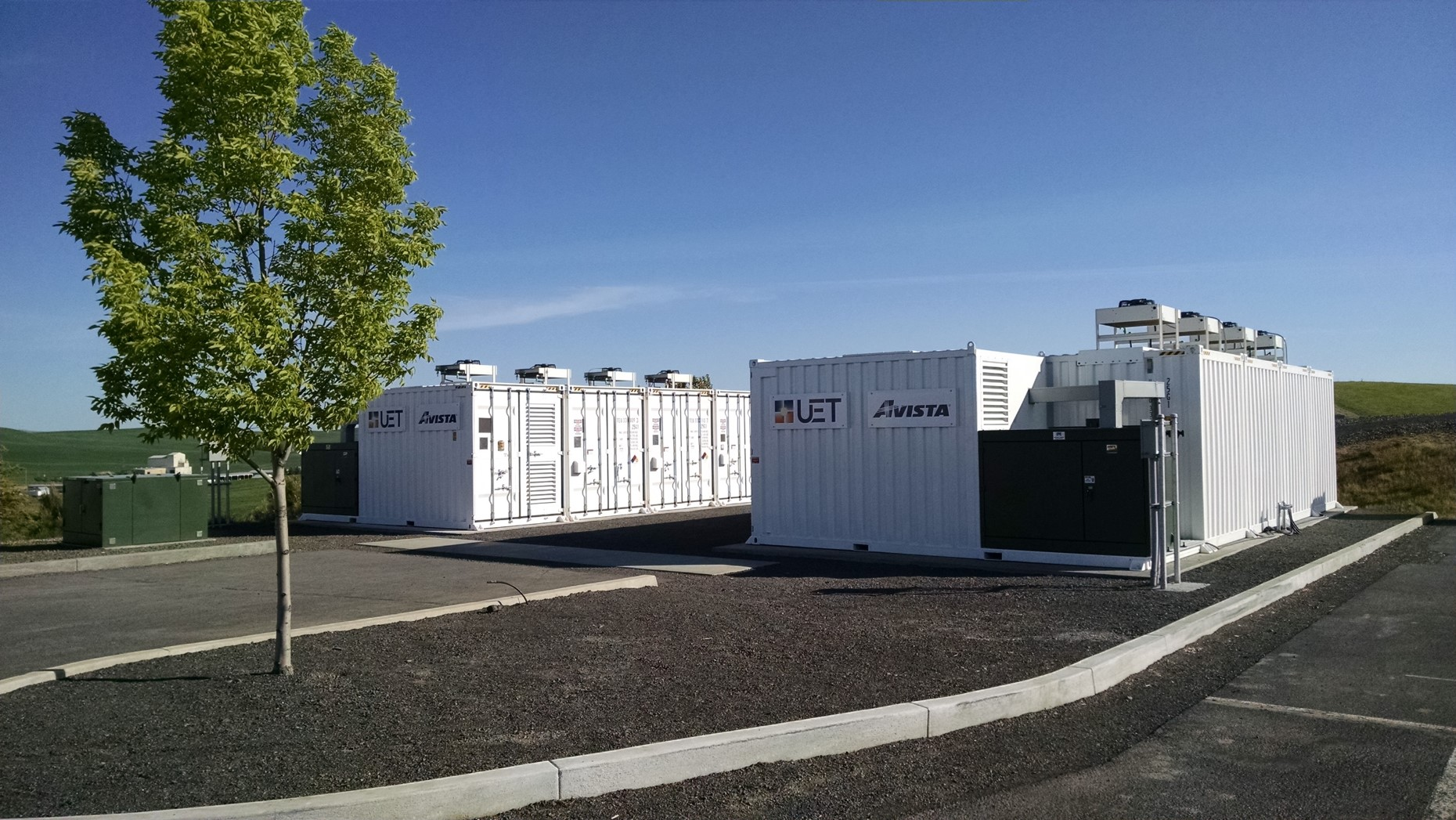
1 MW 4 MWh containerized vanadium flow battery owned by Avista Utilities and manufactured by UniEnergy Technologies

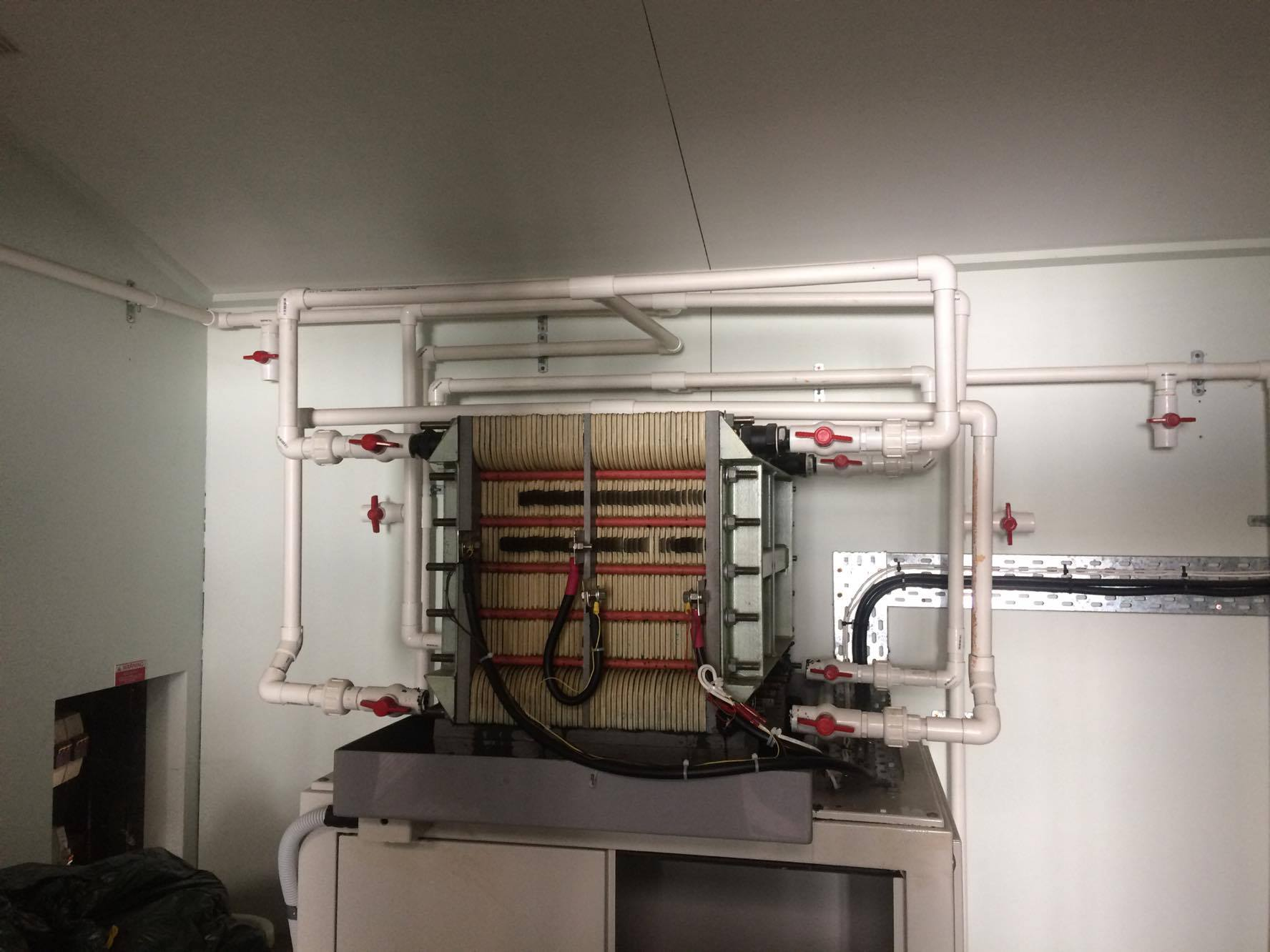
A vanadium redox flow battery located at the University of New South Wales, Sydney, Australia

The vanadium redox battery (VRB), also known as the vanadium flow battery (VFB) or vanadium redox flow battery (VRFB), is a type of rechargeable flow battery which employs vanadium ions as charge carriers. The battery uses vanadium's ability to exist in a solution in four different oxidation states to make a battery with a single electroactive element instead of two.

For several reasons, including their relative bulkiness, vanadium batteries are typically used for grid energy storage, i.e., attached to power plants/electrical grids.

Numerous companies and organizations are involved in funding and developing vanadium redox batteries.

== History ==
Pissoort mentioned the possibility of VRFBs in the 1930s. NASA researchers and Pellegri and Spaziante followed suit in the 1970s, but neither was successful. Maria Skyllas-Kazacos presented the first successful demonstration of an All-Vanadium Redox Flow Battery employing dissolved vanadium in a solution of sulfuric acid in the 1980s. Her design used sulfuric acid electrolytes, and was patented by the University of New South Wales in Australia in 1986.

One of the important breakthroughs achieved by Skyllas-Kazacos and coworkers was the development of a number of processes to produce vanadium electrolytes of over 1.5 M concentration using the lower cost, but insoluble vanadium pentoxide as starting material. These processes involved chemical and electrochemical dissolution and were patented by the University of NSW in 1989. During the 1990s the UNSW group conducted extensive research on membrane selection, graphite felt activation, conducting plastic bipolar electrode fabrication, electrolyte characterisation and optimisation as well as modelling and simulation. Several 1-5 kW VFB prototype batteries were assembled and field tested in a Solar House in Thailand and in an electric golf cart at UNSW.

The UNSW All-Vanadium Redox Flow Battery patents and technology were licensed to Mitsubishi Chemical Corporation and Kashima-Kita Electric Power Corporation in the mid-1990s and subsequently acquired by Sumitomo Electric Industries where extensive field testing was conducted in a wide range of applications in the late 1990s and early 2000s.

In order to extend the operating temperature range of the battery and prevent precipitation of vanadium in the electrolyte at temperatures above 40 °C in the case of V(V), or below 10 °C in case of the negative half-cell solution, Skyllas-Kazacos and coworkers tested hundreds of organic and inorganic additives as potential precipitation inhibitors. They discovered that inorganic phosphate and ammonium compounds were effective in inhibiting precipitation of 2 M vanadium solutions in both the negative and positive half-cell at temperatures of 5 and 45 °C respectively and ammonium phosphate was selected as the most effective stabilising agent. Ammonium and phosphate additives were used to prepare and test a 3 M vanadium electrolyte in a flow cell with excellent results.

In 2022, a 100MW/400MWh VRFB system was installed in Dalian, China.

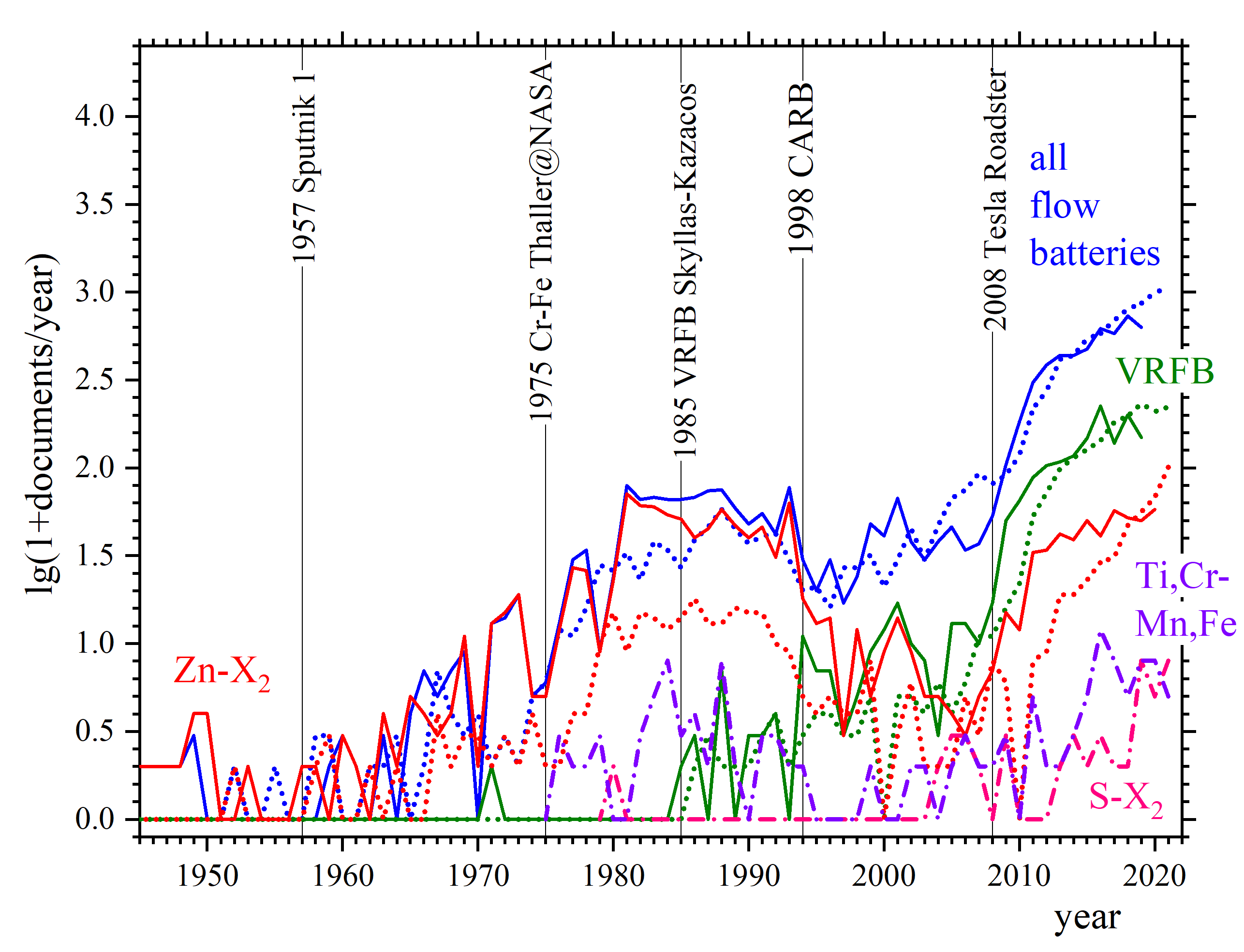
Number of patent families and non-patent publications about several types of flow battery chemistries by year.

== Attributes ==
VRFBs' main advantages over other types of battery:

- energy capacity and power capacity are decoupled and can be scaled separately
- energy capacity is obtained from the storage of liquid electrolytes rather than the cell itself
- power capacity can be increased by adding more cells
- can remain discharged indefinitely without damage
- mixing electrolytes causes no permanent damage
- single charge state across the electrolytes avoids capacity degradation
- non-flammable aqueous electrolyte
- wide operating temperature range including passive cooling
- long charge/discharge cycle lives: 15,000-20,000 cycles and 10–20 years.
- low levelized cost: (a few tens of cents), approaching the 2016 $0.05 target stated by the United States Department of Energy and the European Commission Strategic Energy Technology Plan €0.05 target.

VRFBs' main disadvantages compared to other types of battery:

- high and volatile prices of vanadium minerals (i.e. the cost of VRFB energy)
- relatively poor round trip efficiency (compared to lithium-ion batteries)
- heavy weight of aqueous electrolyte
- relatively poor energy-to-volume ratio compared to standard storage batteries
- having moving parts in the pumps that produce the flow of electrolyte solution
- toxicity of vanadium (V) compounds.

== Design ==
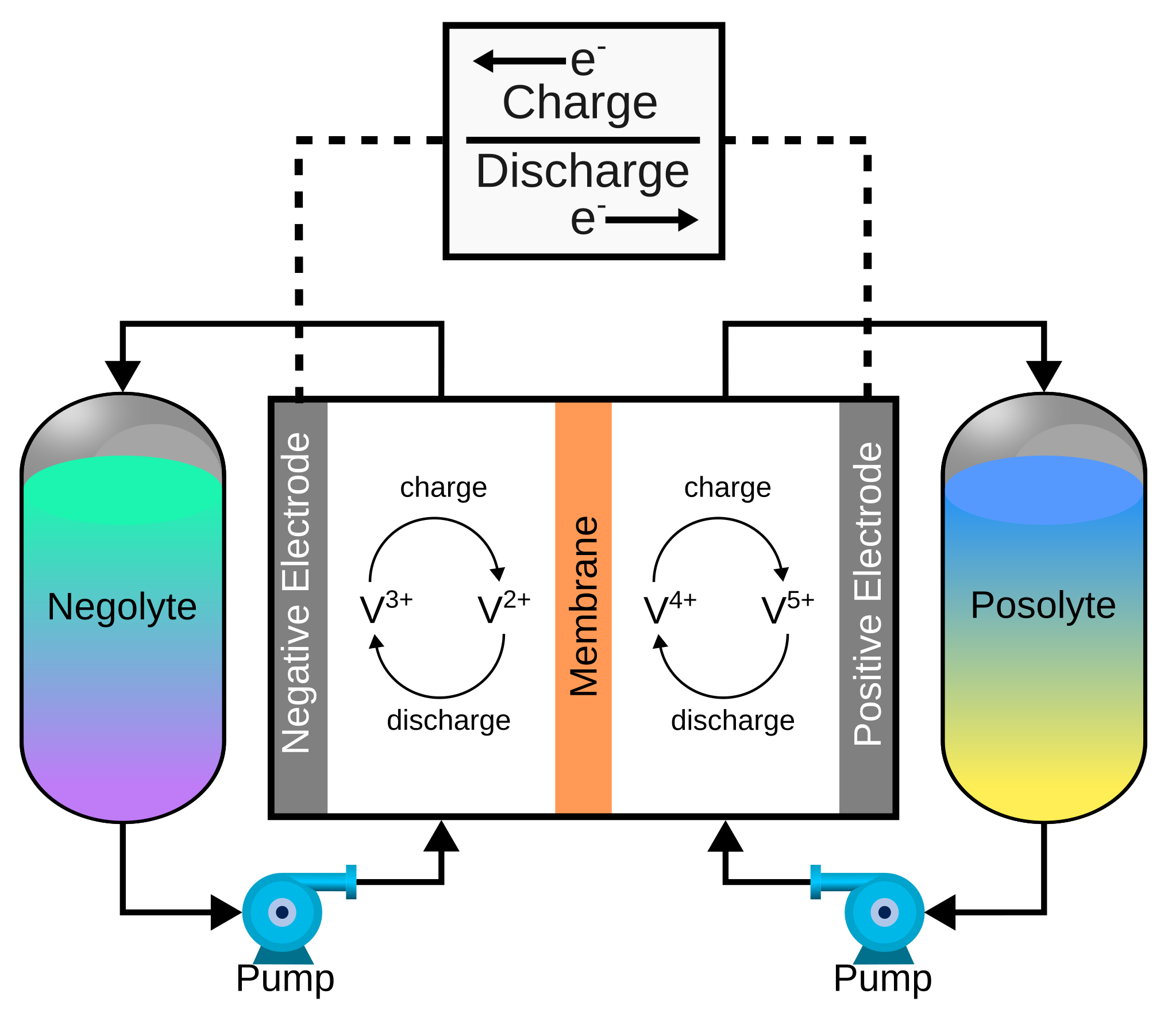
Schematic of vanadium redox flow battery.

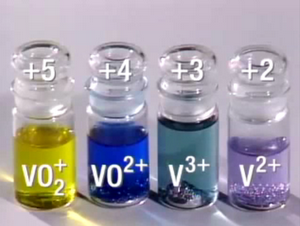
Solutions of Vanadium sulfates in four different oxidation states of vanadium.

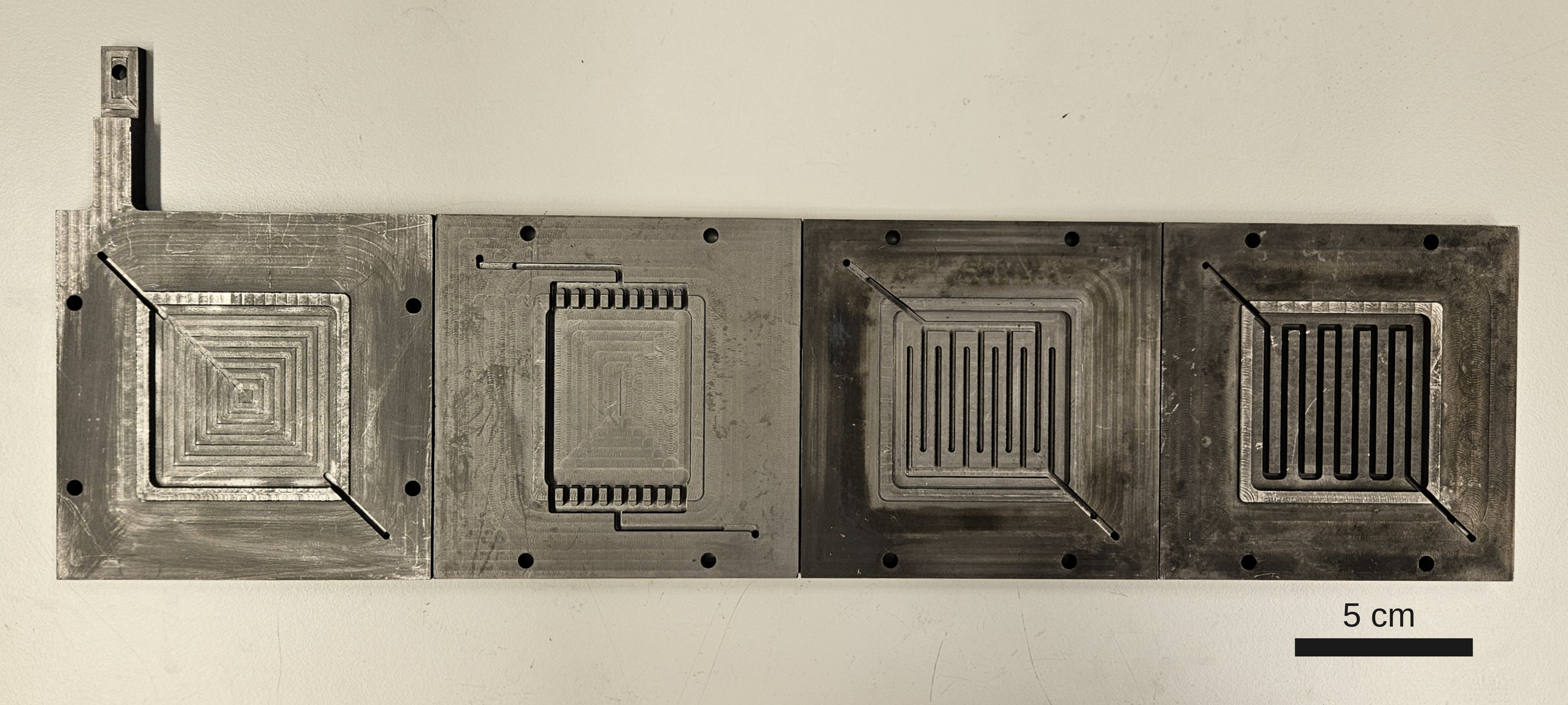
Different types of graphite flow fields are used in vanadium flow batteries. From left to right: rectangular channels, rectangular channels with flow distributor, interdigitated flow field, and serpentine flow field.

=== Electrode ===
The electrodes in a VRB cell are carbon based. Several types of carbon electrodes used in VRB cell have been reported such as carbon felt, carbon paper, carbon cloth, and graphite felt. Carbon-based materials have the advantages of low cost, low resistivity and good stability. Among them, carbon felt and graphite felt are preferred because of their enhanced three-dimensional network structures and higher specific surface areas, as well as good conductivity and chemical and electrochemical stability.

The pristine carbon-based electrode exhibits hydrophobicity and limited catalytic activity when interacting with vanadium species. To enhance its catalytic performance and wettability, several approaches have been employed, including thermal treatment, acid treatment, electrochemical modification, and the incorporation of catalysts. Carbon felt is typically produced by pyrolyzing polyacrylonitrile (PAN) or rayon fibers at approximately 1500 °C and 1400 °C, respectively. Graphite felt, on the other hand, undergoes pyrolysis at a higher temperature of about 2400 °C. To thermally activate the felt electrodes, the material is heated to 400 °C in an air or oxygen-containing atmosphere. This process significantly increases the surface area of the felt, enhancing it by a factor of 10. The activity towards vanadium species are attribute to the increase in oxygen functional groups such as carbonyl group (C=O) and carboxyl group (C-O) after thermal treatment in air. Many other surface modifications have shown improvement in activity such as graphene oxide and polyaniline. There is currently no consensus regarding the specific functional groups and reaction mechanisms that dictate the interaction of vanadium species on the surface of the electrode. It has been proposed that the V(II)/V(III) reaction follows an inner-sphere mechanism, while the V(IV)/V(V) reaction tends to proceed through an outer-sphere mechanism.

=== Electrolyte ===
Both electrolytes are vanadium-based. The electrolyte in the positive half-cells contains VO^{+}_{2} and VO^{2+} ions, while the electrolyte in the negative half-cells consists of V^{3+} and V^{2+} ions. The electrolytes can be prepared by several processes, including electrolytically dissolving vanadium pentoxide (V_{2}O_{5}) in sulfuric acid (H_{2}SO_{4}). The solution is strongly acidic in use.

=== Membrane ===
The membrane should allow protons to cross while keeping electrons and other ions separate. This creates charge separation and thus voltage. The most common membrane material is perfluorinated sulfonic acid (PFSA or Nafion). However, vanadium ions can penetrate a PFSA membrane, a phenomenon known as crossing-over, reducing the energy capacity of the battery. A 2021 study found that penetration is reduced with hybrid sheets made by growing tungsten trioxide nanoparticles on the surface of single-layered graphene oxide sheets. These hybrid sheets are then embedded into a sandwich structured PFSA membrane reinforced with polytetrafluoroethylene (Teflon). The nanoparticles also promote proton transport, offering high coulombic efficiency and energy efficiency of more than 98.1 percent and 88.9 percent, respectively.

=== Flow field ===
The resistive losses identified by the polarisation curve can be attributed to three main areas: activation loss, ohmic loss, and mass transport loss. Activation loss arises from slow charge transfer kinetics between the surface of the electrode and electrolyte. Ohmic losses are from the ohmic resistance of the electrolyte, electrode, membrane, and current collector. Ohmic losses can be reduced by improved cell design, such as zero-gap cell design and reduced membrane thickness. Mass transport losses are from the lack of active vanadium species being transported to the electrode surface. The flow field design that promotes convective mass transport is crucial to reducing mass transport losses. Serpentine and interdigitated flow field designs were produced by machining a bipolar plate adjacent to the porous electrode. The felt electrode can also be cut to create an electrolyte flow channel. Both serpentine and interdigitated flow fields have been shown to enhance mass transport, which reduces mass transport polarisation and therefore increases limiting current density and peak power density. Flow dispensers are sometimes placed in the cell to distribute the flow and reduce jets. The flow field must also be designed to provide uniform electrolyte distribution to prevent dead zones in the cell and reduce pressure drop across the cell stack.

== Operation ==
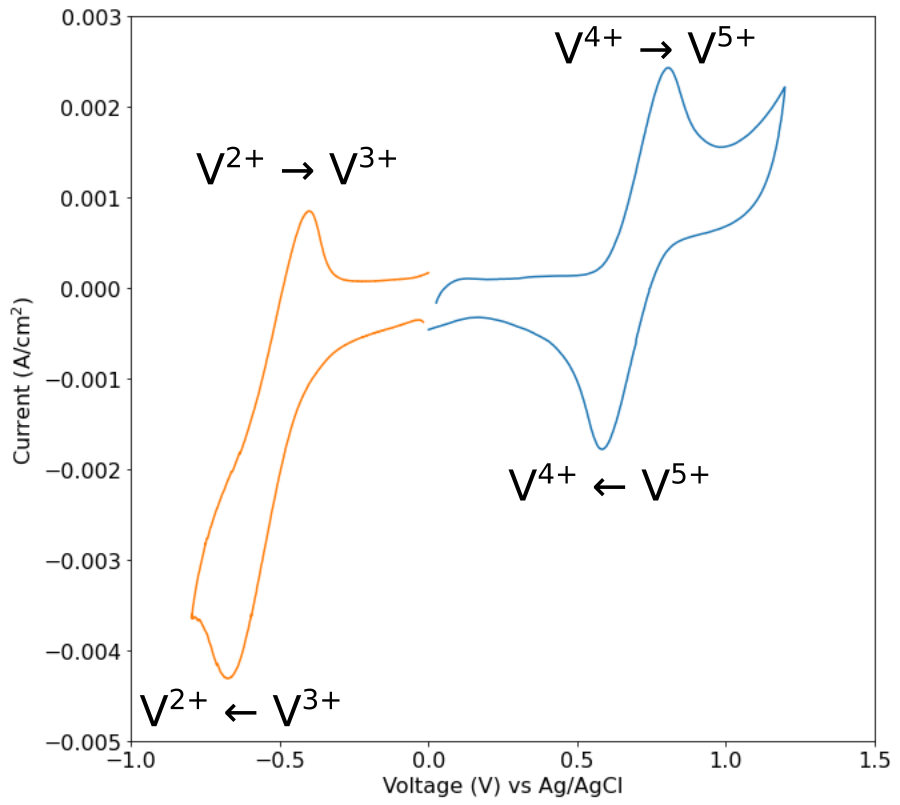
Cyclic voltammogram of vanadium (IV) solution in sulfuric acid solution

The reaction uses the half-reactions:

VO^{+}_{2} + 2H^{+} + e^{−} → VO^{2+} + H_{2}O (E° = +1.00 V)
V^{3+} + e^{−} → V^{2+} (E° = −0.26 V)

Other useful properties of vanadium flow batteries are their fast response to changing loads and their overload capacities. They can achieve a response time of under half a millisecond for a 100% load change, and allow overloads of as much as 400% for 10 seconds. Response time is limited mostly by the electrical equipment. Unless specifically designed for colder or warmer climates, most sulfuric acid-based vanadium batteries work between about 10 and 40 °C. Below that temperature range, the ion-infused sulfuric acid crystallizes. Round trip efficiency in practical applications is around 70–80%.

The original VRFB design by Skyllas-Kazacos employed sulfate (added as vanadium sulfate(s) and sulfuric acid) as the only anion in VRFB solutions, which limited the maximum vanadium concentration to 1.7 M of vanadium ions. In the 1990s, Skyllas-Kazacos discovered the use of ammonium phosphate and other inorganic compounds as precipitation inhibitors to stabilise 2 M vanadium solutions over a temperature range of 5 to 45 °C and a Stabilising Agent patent was filed by UNSW in 1993. This discovery was largely overlooked however and in around 2010 a team from Pacific Northwest National Laboratory proposed a mixed sulfate-chloride electrolyte, that allowed for the use in VRFBs solutions with the vanadium concentration of 2.5 M over a whole temperature range between −20 and +50 °C. Based on the standard equilibrium potential of the V^{5+}/V^{4+} couple it is expected to oxidize chloride, and for this reason chloride solutions were avoided in earlier VRFB studies. The surprising oxidative stability (albeit only at the state of charge below ca. 80%) of V^{5+} solutions in the presence of chloride was explained on the basis of activity coefficients. Many researchers explain the increased stability of V(V) at elevated temperatures by the higher proton concentration in the mixed acid electrolyte that shifts the thermal precipitation equilibrium of V(V) away from V_{2}O_{5}. Nevertheless, because of a high vapor pressure of HCl solutions and the possibility of chlorine generation during charging, such mixed electrolytes have not been widely adopted.

Another variation is the use of vanadium bromide salts. Since the redox potential of Br_{2}/2Br^{−} couple is more negative than that of V^{5+}/V^{4+}, the positive electrode operates via the bromine process. However, due to problems with volatility and corrosivity of Br_{2}, they did not gain much popularity (see zinc-bromine battery for a similar problem). A vanadium/cerium flow battery has also been proposed .

== Specific energy and energy density ==
VRBs achieve a specific energy of about 20 Wh/kg (72 kJ/kg) of electrolyte. Precipitation inhibitors can increase the density to about 35 Wh/kg (126 kJ/kg), with higher densities possible by controlling the electrolyte temperature. The specific energy is low compared to other rechargeable battery types (e.g., lead–acid, 30–40 Wh/kg (108–144 kJ/kg); and lithium ion, 80–200 Wh/kg (288–720 kJ/kg)).

== Applications ==
VRFBs' large potential capacity may be best-suited to buffer the irregular output of utility-scale wind and solar systems.

Their reduced self-discharge makes them potentially appropriate in applications that require long-term energy storage with little maintenance—as in military equipment, such as the sensor components of the GATOR mine system.

They feature rapid response times well suited to uninterruptible power supply (UPS) applications, where they can replace lead–acid batteries or diesel generators. Fast response time is also beneficial for frequency regulation. These capabilities make VRFBs an effective "all-in-one" solution for microgrids, frequency regulation and load shifting.

== Deployment ==
Largest operational vanadium redox batteries
Name	Commissioning date	Energy (MWh)	Power (MW)	Duration (hours)	Facility	Country
Jimusar $520 million	1 January 2026	1000	200	5	1 GW solar	China
Xihnua Ushi	2024	700	175	4		China
Dalian $266 million	October 2022	400 (800)	100 (200)	4		China
Minami Hayakita Substation	December 2015	60	15	4		Japan
Pfinztal, Baden-Württemberg	September 2019	20	2	10	Wind turbines	Germany
Woniushi, Liaoning		10	5	2		China
Tomamae Wind Farm	2005	6	4	1:30	Wind turbines	Japan
Zhangbei Project	2016	8	2	4		China
SnoPUD MESA 2 Project	March 2017	8	2	4		USA
San Miguel Substation	2017	8	2	4		USA
Pullman Washington	April 2015	4	1	4		USA
Under construction
Laufenburg Technology Center	202x	1600	800	2	AI data centre; Invinity Energy Systems selected to design the vanadium flow battery	Switzerland
Chabuchar (Xinjiang)	202x	1000	250	4		China
Xinhua Wushi	202x	1000	250		hybrid LFP&vanadium, 1GW each	China
	202x					

== Development ==
Companies funding or developing vanadium redox batteries include Sumitomo Electric Industries, CellCube (Enerox), UniEnergy Technologies, StorEn Technologies in Australia, Largo Energy and Ashlawn Energy in the United States; H2 in Gyeryong-si, South Korea; Renewable Energy Dynamics Technology, Invinity Energy Systems in the United Kingdom, Schmalz, LIVA Power Management Systems in Europe; Prudent Energy in China; Australian Vanadium, CellCube and North Harbour Clean Energy in Australia; Yadlamalka Energy Trust and Invinity Energy Systems in Australia; EverFlow Energy JV SABIC SCHMID Group in Saudi Arabia and Bushveld Minerals in South Africa.

== See also ==
- List of battery types
- Polysulfide bromide battery – Flow battery
