= Niobium perchlorate =

Niobium(V) perchlorate
Names
- Other names: Niobium(V) perchlorate

Identifiers
3D model (JSmol)	Interactive image
- InChI: InChI=1S/5ClHO4.Nb/c5*2-1(3,4)5;/h5*(H,2,3,4,5);/q;;;;;+5/p-5 Key: CVPZOZZKOZLDIB-UHFFFAOYSA-I
- SMILES: O=Cl(=O)(=O)O[Nb](OCl(=O)(=O)=O)(OCl(=O)(=O)=O)(OCl(=O)(=O)=O)OCl(=O)(=O)=O

Properties
Chemical formula	Nb(ClO_{4})_{5}
Molar mass	590.14 g·mol^{−1}
Appearance	White crystals
Melting point	70 °C (158 °F; 343 K) (decomposes)
Solubility in water	Reacts

Related compounds
Other cations	Vanadyl perchlorate Tantalum(V) perchlorate
- Except where otherwise noted, data are given for materials in their standard state (at 25 °C [77 °F], 100 kPa). Infobox references

Niobium perchlorate, or more precisely niobium(V) perchlorate, is a chemical compound with the formula Nb(ClO_{4})_{5}. It is a hygroscopic, white crystalline solid that readily reacts with moist air or water to produce niobium(V) oxide.

== Synthesis and reactions ==
Niobium(V) perchlorate is produced from the reaction of niobium pentachloride and anhydrous perchloric acid:

NbCl_{5} + 5 HClO_{4} → Nb(ClO_{4})_{5} + 5 HCl

It decomposes at 70 °C (343 K; 158 °F) to niobyl perchlorate, releasing dichlorine heptoxide:

Nb(ClO_{4})_{5} → NbO(ClO_{4})_{3} + Cl_{2}O_{7}

Niobyl perchlorate further decomposes at 115 °C (388 K; 239 °F) to NbO_{2}ClO_{4} (niobium(V) dioxide perchlorate), which decomposes at 220 °C (493 K; 428 °F) to niobium pentoxide.

Perchloratoniobates, such as Cs^{+}[Nb(ClO_{4})_{6}]^{−} (caesium hexaperchloratoniobate(V)) and (Cs^{+})_{2}[Nb(ClO_{4})_{7}]^{2−} (caesium heptaperchloratoniobate(V)), are produced by the reaction of perchlorate sources, such as cesium perchlorate and niobium perchlorate, in anhydrous perchloric acid at 0 °C (273 K; 32 °F).

== Structure ==
Although the structure of niobium(V) perchlorate has not been elucidated by single-crystal X-ray diffraction, the structure has been probed by IR spectroscopy and powder X-ray diffraction. Niobium(V) perchlorate has both monodentate and bidentate perchlorate ligands.
