= Cavansite =

Calcium vanadium phyllosilicate mineral

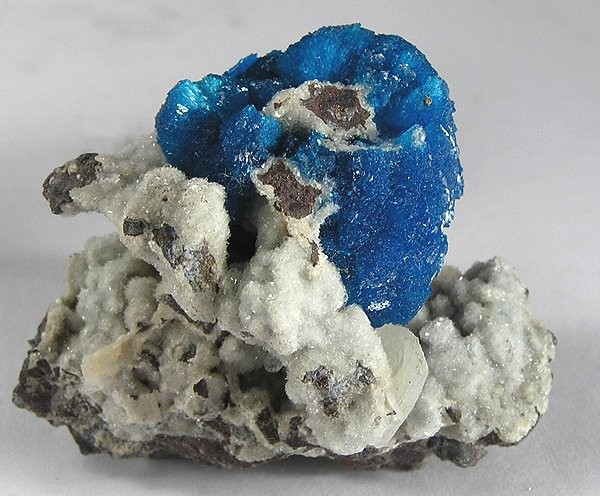
- Cavansite on heulandite

General
- Category: Phyllosilicate minerals
- Formula: Ca(VO)Si_{4}O_{10}·4(H_{2}O)
- IMA symbol: Cav
- Crystal system: Orthorhombic
- Crystal class: Dipyramidal (mmm); H–M Symbol: (2/m 2/m 2/m)
- Space group: Pcmn
- Unit cell: a = 9.792(2) Å, b = 13.644(3) Å, c = 9.629(2) Å; Z = 4

Identification
- Color: Brilliant sky-blue to greenish blue
- Crystal habit: Radiating acicular prismatic crystals commonly as spherulitic rosettes
- Cleavage: Good on {010}
- Tenacity: Brittle
- Mohs scale hardness: 3 - 4
- Luster: Vitreous, pearly
- Streak: Bluish-white
- Diaphaneity: Transparent
- Specific gravity: 2.25 - 2.33
- Optical properties: Biaxial (+)
- Refractive index: n_{α} = 1.542(2) n_{β} = 1.544(2) n_{γ} = 1.551(2)
- Birefringence: δ = 0.009
- Pleochroism: Visible: X=Z= colorless Y= blue
- 2V angle: Measured: 52°

Cavansite, named for its chemical composition of calcium vanadium silicate, is a deep blue hydrous calcium vanadium phyllosilicate mineral, occurring as a secondary mineral in basaltic and andesitic rocks along with a variety of zeolite minerals. Its blue coloring comes from vanadium, a metal ion. Discovered in 1967 in Malheur County, Oregon, cavansite is a relatively rare mineral. It is polymorphic with the even rarer mineral, pentagonite. It is most frequently found in Pune, India, and in the Deccan Traps, a large igneous province.

== Uses of cavansite ==
Although cavansite contains vanadium, and could thus be a possible ore source for the element, it is not generally considered an ore mineral. However, because of its rich color and relative rarity, cavansite is a sought-after collector's mineral.

== Associated minerals ==
- Members of the apophyllite group
- Members of the zeolite group, particularly stilbite
- babingtonite, Ca_{2}Fe_{2}Si_{5}O_{14}OH
- quartz, SiO_{2}
- calcite, CaCO_{3}
- pentagonite, Ca(VO)Si_{4}O_{10} · 4(H_{2}O)

== Notes for identification ==
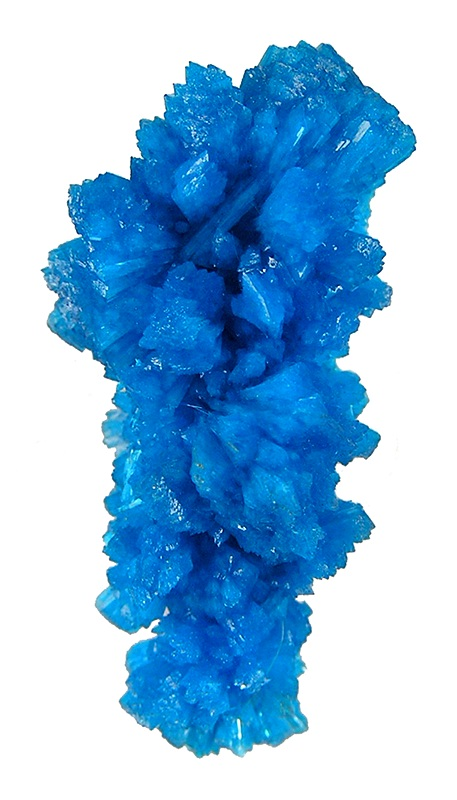
Stalactitic cavansite, 3.6 x 2.1 x 1.8 cm, Wagholi, Pune District, Maharashtra, India

Cavansite is a distinctive mineral. It tends to form crystal aggregates, generally in the form of balls, up to a couple centimeters in size. Sometimes, the balls are coarse enough to resolve individual crystals. Rarely, cavansite forms bowtie-shaped aggregates. The color of cavansite is distinctive, almost always a rich, bright blue. The color is the same as its dimorph, pentagonite, but the latter is generally much more spikey with bladed crystals. Finally, the associated minerals aid identification, as cavansite is frequently found atop a matrix of zeolites or apophyllites.
