= Vanadyl perchlorate =

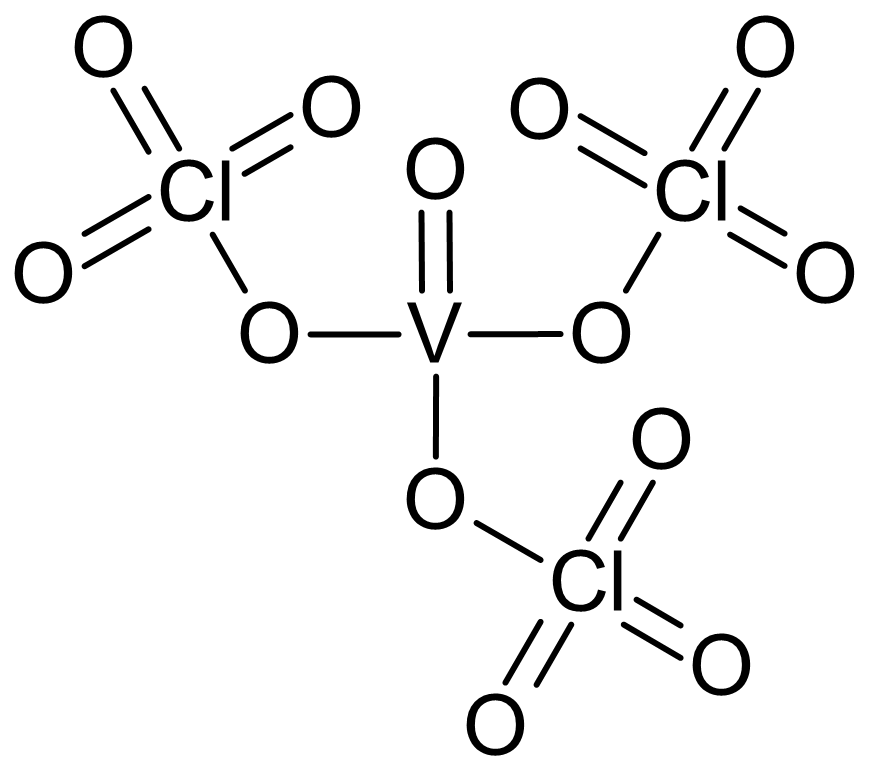

Names
- Other names tripercloratooxovanadium

Identifiers
CAS Number	67632-69-3
3D model (JSmol)	Interactive image
- InChI: InChI=1S/3ClHO4.O.V/c3*2-1(3,4)5;;/h3*(H,2,3,4,5);;/q;;;;+3/p-3 Key: XTDRROXTBUWEJW-UHFFFAOYSA-K
- SMILES: O=[V](OCl(=O)(=O)=O)(OCl(=O)(=O)=O)OCl(=O)(=O)=O

Properties
Chemical formula	VO(ClO_{4})_{3}
Molar mass	356.29 g/mol
Appearance	golden yellow liquid or crystals.
Melting point	21-22 °C
Boiling point	33.5 °C in vacuum

Hazards
- Occupational safety and health (OHS/OSH)
Main hazards	oxidant

Related compounds
Related compounds	Niobium perchlorate; Vanadyl nitrate; Chromyl perchlorate
- Except where otherwise noted, data are given for materials in their standard state (at 25 °C [77 °F], 100 kPa). Infobox references

Vanadyl perchlorate or vanadyl triperchlorate is a golden yellow coloured liquid or crystalline compound of vanadium, oxygen and perchlorate. The substance consists of molecules covalently bound and is quite volatile; it ignites organic solvents on contact and explodes at temperatures above 80 °C.

== Formation ==
Vanadyl perchlorate can be made by reacting vanadium pentoxide with dichlorine heptoxide at 5 °C. It is purified by vacuum distillation and recrystallisation at 21 °C.

A solution of vanadium(V) perchlorate can be made by dissolving vanadium pentoxide in perchloric acid.

The reaction of vanadium pentoxide and dichlorine hexoxide could produce VO(ClO_{4})_{3}:

2 V_{2}O_{5} + 12 Cl_{2}O_{6} → 4 VO(ClO_{4})_{3} + 12 ClO_{2} + 3 O_{2}

== Reactions ==
It can react with vanadium oxychloride to form another vanadium perchlorate (VO_{2}ClO_{4}):

4 VO(ClO_{4})_{3} + 2 VOCl_{3} → 6 VO_{2}ClO_{4} + 6 ClO_{2} + 3 Cl_{2} + 3 O_{2}

== Related compounds ==
Other perchlorates include pervanadyl perchlorate, also known as dioxovanadium perchlorate, which contains VO_{2}^{+} ions, vanadyl diperchlorate, oxovanadium perchlorate or vanadium(IV) perchlorate, and VO(ClO_{4})_{2}, which dissolves in water. Vanadic perchlorate, also known as vanadium(III) perchlorate solution in water, is a green-tinged blue colour, significantly different to most other V(III) solutions, which are complexed.
