= Vanadyl nitrate =

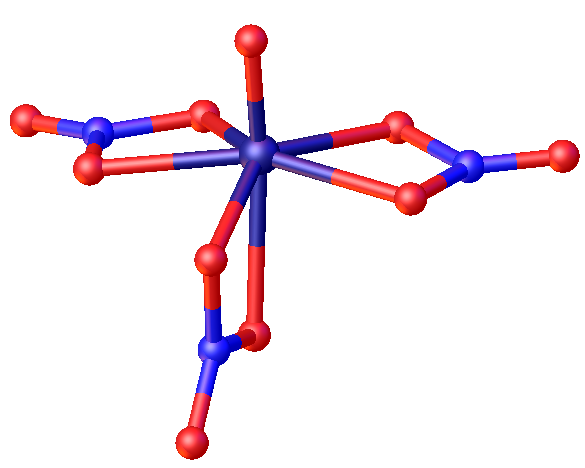

Names
- Other names trinitratooxovanadium

Identifiers
CAS Number	16017-37-1
3D model (JSmol)	Interactive image
ChemSpider	67496691
CompTox Dashboard (EPA)	DTXSID701031904
- InChI: InChI=1S/3NO3.O.V/c3*2-1(3)4;;/q3*-1;;+3 Key: NRKQBMOGOKEWPX-UHFFFAOYSA-N
- SMILES: [V](O[N+]([O-])=O)(O[N+]([O-])=O)(O[N+]([O-])=O)=O

Properties
Chemical formula	VO(NO_{3})_{3}
Molar mass	252.953 g/mol
Appearance	yellow liquid.
Melting point	2 °C (36 °F; 275 K)
Boiling point	86 to 91 °C (187 to 196 °F; 359 to 364 K) at 0.7mm Hg
Solubility in water	Hydrolysis

Hazards
- Occupational safety and health (OHS/OSH)
Main hazards	oxidant

Related compounds
Related compounds	titanium nitrate, vanadyl perchlorate
- Except where otherwise noted, data are given for materials in their standard state (at 25 °C [77 °F], 100 kPa). Infobox references

Vanadyl nitrate, also called vanadium oxytrinitrate or vanadium oxynitrate, is an inorganic compound of vanadium in the +5 oxidation state with nitrate ligands and oxygen. The formula is VO(NO_{3})_{3}. It is a pale yellow viscous liquid.

== Properties ==
Vanadyl nitrate dissolves in dichloromethane, nitromethane, carbon tetrachloride, and saturated hydrocarbons. 1-Hexene, or other unsaturated hydrocarbons ignite upon contact with vanadyl nitrate. Upon contact with water, it irreversibly hydrolyzes, releasing nitric acid.

The ultraviolet spectrum of the liquid shows an absorption band peaking at 208 nm with a shoulder at 242 nm.

At 55 °C, gaseous vanadyl nitrate has absorption bands also at 486, 582 and 658 nm in the visual light spectrum.

In the infrared region, liquid vanadyl nitrate absorbs at 1880, 1633, 1612, 1560, 1306, 1205, 1016, 996, 965, 895, 783, 632, 457, 357, 301, 283, 234, 193, 133, 93 and 59 cm^{−1}.

Gaseous vanadyl nitrate has absorption bands at 775, 783, 786, 962.5, 994.4, 997.5, 1000.5, 1006.2, 1012, 1016.3, 1020, 1198, 1211, 1216.3, 1564, 1612, 1629, 1632, 1635, 1648 and 1888 cm^{−1}.

Many of these bands are due to stretching in nitrogen–oxygen bonds, but 1016.3 cm^{−1} is due to the double vanadium–oxygen bond. 786 is due to out of phase wagging in N-O, and 775 is due to deformation in O-N=O in the mirror plane.

== Structure ==
VO(NO_{3})_{3} has a distorted pentagonal bipyramidal shape with idealized C_{s} (mirror) symmetry. The vanadium oxygen bond (157.2 pm) is typical for vanadyl(V). Two nitrate groups in the pentagonal plane are bidentate (V-O distances range from 199 to 206 pm). The third nitrate spans the pentagonal plane (197 pm) to the position trans to oxo (223 pm).

== Production ==
It is made by soaking vanadium pentoxide in liquid dinitrogen pentoxide for durations around two days at room temperature. The yield for this method is about 85%.

V_{2}O_{5} + 3 N_{2}O_{5} → 2 VO(NO_{3})_{3}.

Purification can be achieved by vacuum distillation.

Mononitratodioxovanadium (VO_{2}NO_{3}) is an intermediate in this synthesis. It is a brick red solid.

Vanadyl nitrate can also be made from vanadyl trichloride VOCl_{3} and dinitrogen pentoxide.

== Reactions ==
It is a nitrating agent for aromatic compounds. Reactions proceed at room temperature. Often dichloromethane is used as an inert solvent. Nitrotoluene, methyl benzoate and benzoic acid are nitrated by prolonged exposure over a few days. Benzonitrile does not react.

Vanadyl nitrate forms a solid pale yellow adduct with boron trifluoride. An adduct is also formed with acetonitrile.

== Other reading ==
- Gmelin, Syst No 48, Teil A & Teil B (Lieferung 1 & 2) (1967); Teil A (Lieferung 1) & Teil A (Lieferung 2) (1968);& Erganzungwerk (Band2)(1971)
- M. Schmeisser, "Chemical Abstracts", (1955), 49, 10873
- L. Bretherick, Ed, "Hazards in the Chemical Laboratory", Royal Society of Chemistry, London, Engl (1979), pg. 1160
