= Pentagonite =

Calcium vanadium phyllosilicate mineral

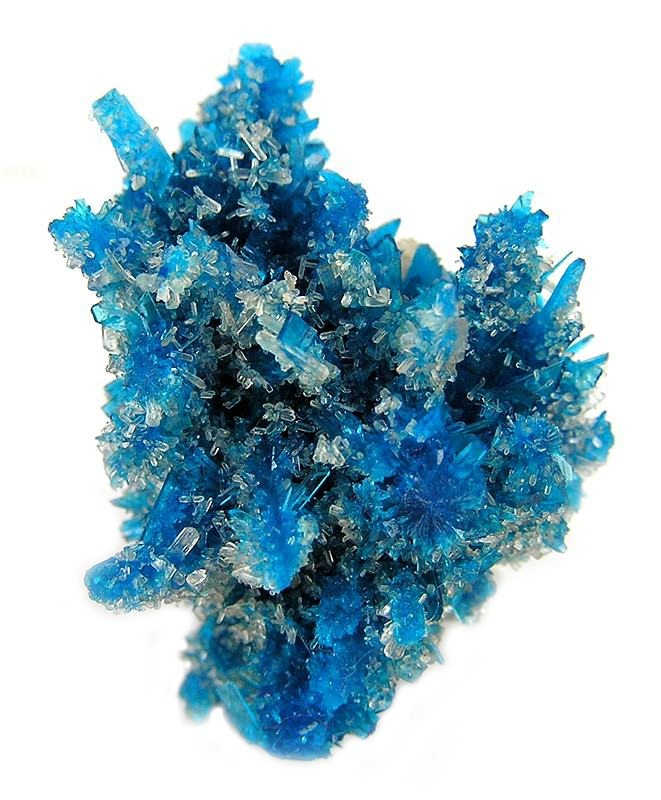

General
- Category: Phyllosilicate minerals
- Formula: Ca(VO)Si_{4}O_{10}·4H_{2}O
- IMA symbol: Ptg
- Strunz classification: 9.EA.55
- Crystal system: Orthorhombic
- Crystal class: Pyramidal (mm2) (same H-M symbol)
- Space group: Ccm2_{1}
- Unit cell: a = 10.386(4) Å, b = 14.046(7) Å, c = 8.975(2) Å; Z = 4

Identification
- Color: Greenish blue
- Crystal habit: Prismatic crystals, often as radiating clusters
- Twinning: Multiple twins producing a pseudo-pentagonal symmetry
- Cleavage: Good on {010}
- Tenacity: Brittle
- Mohs scale hardness: 3 - 4
- Luster: Vitreous
- Diaphaneity: Transparent
- Specific gravity: 2.33
- Optical properties: Biaxial (-)
- Refractive index: n_{α} = 1.533 n_{β} = 1.544 n_{γ} = 1.547
- Birefringence: δ = 0.014
- Pleochroism: Visible: X=Z= colorless Y= blue
- 2V angle: Measured: 50°

Pentagonite is a rare phyllosilicate mineral with formula Ca(VO)Si_{4}O_{10}·4H_{2}O. Its characteristic blue color is due to the presence of the vanadyl (VO^{2+}) cation in its crystal lattice. The oxidation state of vanadium in the vanadyl cation is +4; therefore, it is a divalent cation. It was named for the unusual twinning called a fiveling with an apparent five-fold symmetry. It is a dimorph of cavansite.

Pentagonite was first described in 1973 for an occurrence in Lake Owyhee State Park, Malheur County, Oregon. It has also been reported from the Pune district of India. It occurs as fracture and cavity fillings in tuff and basalt. It occurs with cavansite, heulandite, stilbite, analcime, apophyllite and calcite.
