= Vanadyl isopropoxide =

Names
- Other names Triisopropoxyvanadium(V) oxide; VTIP; Vanadium(V) trisisopropoxide oxide

Identifiers
CAS Number	5588-84-1
3D model (JSmol)	Interactive image
ChemSpider	21171176
ECHA InfoCard	100.024.544
EC Number	226-997-4
PubChem CID	79702
CompTox Dashboard (EPA)	DTXSID60904393
- InChI: InChI=1S/3C3H8O.O.V/c3*1-3(2)4;;/h3*3-4H,1-2H3;; Key: JOUSPCDMLWUHSO-UHFFFAOYSA-N
- SMILES: O=[V](OC(C)C)(OC(C)C)OC(C)C

Properties
Chemical formula	C_{9}H_{21}O_{4}V
Molar mass	244.205 g·mol^{−1}
Melting point	−14 to −11 °C (7 to 12 °F; 259 to 262 K)
Boiling point	242 °C (468 °F; 515 K)

Hazards
- GHS labelling
Pictograms	(GHS02: Flammable) (GHS07: Exclamation mark)
Signal word	Warning
Hazard statements	H226, H315, H319, H335
Precautionary statements	P210, P233, P240, P241, P242, P243, P261, P264, P271, P280, P302+P352, P303+P361+P353, P304+P340, P305+P351+P338, P312, P321, P332+P313, P337+P313, P362, P370+P378, P403+P233, P403+P235, P405, P501
- Except where otherwise noted, data are given for materials in their standard state (at 25 °C [77 °F], 100 kPa). Infobox references

Vanadyl isopropoxide is the metal alkoxide with the formula VO(O-iPr)_{3} (iPr = CH(CH_{3})_{2}). A yellow volatile liquid, it is a common alkoxide of vanadium. It is used as a reagent and as a precursor to vanadium oxides. The compound is diamagnetic. It is prepared by alcoholysis of vanadyl trichloride:

VOCl_{3} + 3 HOCH(CH_{3})_{2} → VO(OCH(CH_{3})_{2})_{3} + 3 HCl

The related cyclopentanoxide VO(O-CH(CH_{2})_{4})_{3} is a dimer, one pair of alkoxide ligands bind weakly trans to the vanadyl oxygens.
