= UniEnergy Technologies =

Former gridscale Battery manufacturer

- Company type: LLC
- Industry: Renewable Energy
- Founded: 2012, 14 years ago
- Headquarters: Mukilteo, Washington
- Key people: Gary Yang (Founder, CTO) Rick Winter (President, CEO)
- Products: ReFlex Flow Battery
- Number of employees: 52

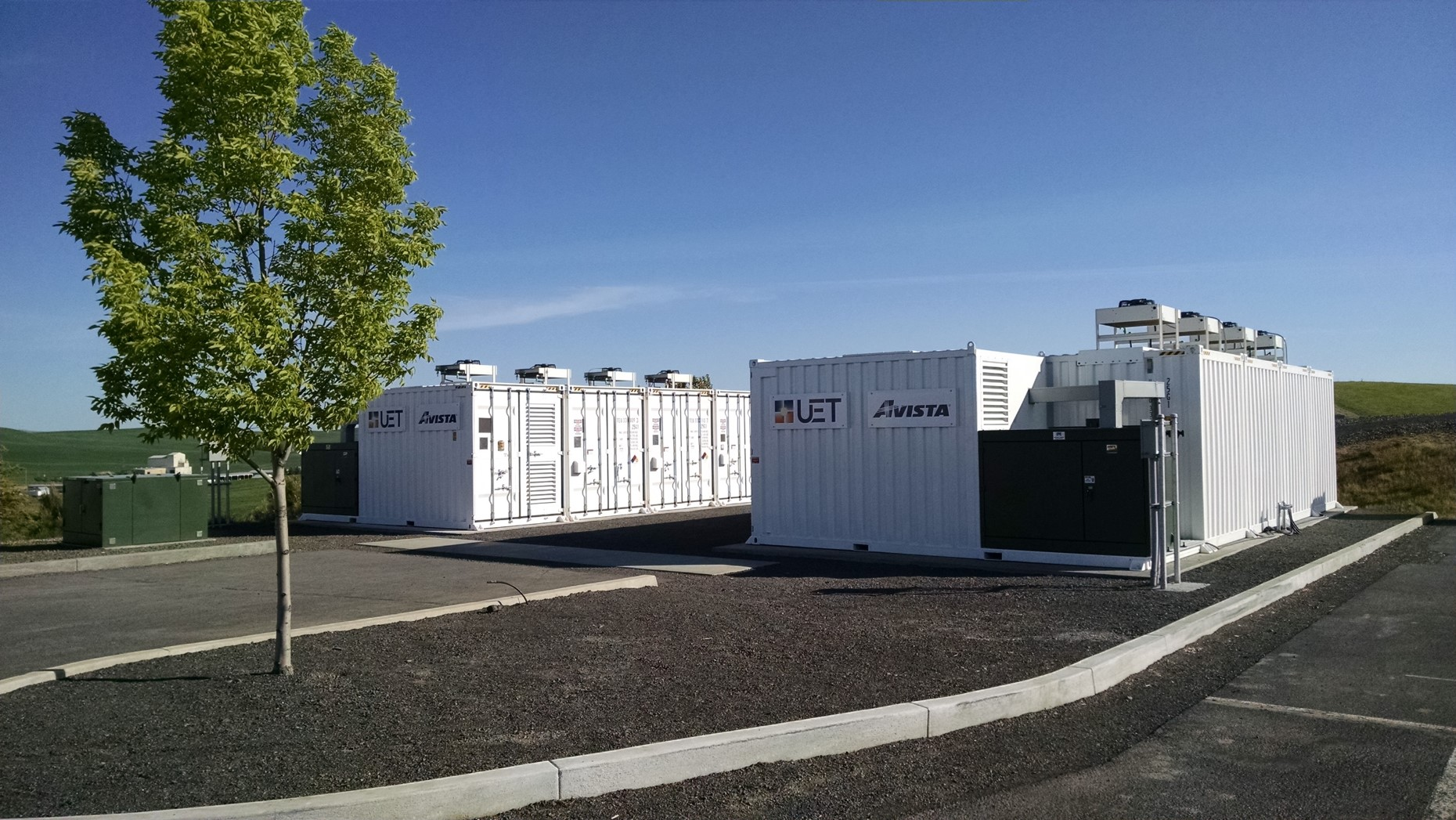
The 1 MW 4 MWh containerized vanadium flow battery owned by Avista Utilities and manufactured by UniEnergy Technologies.

UniEnergy Technologies (UET) was a U.S. vanadium redox flow battery manufacturer in Mukilteo, Washington, which manufactured megawatt-scale energy storage systems for utility, commercial and industrial customers.

== History ==
The company was founded in 2012 by Dr. Gary Yang and Dr. Liyu Li to commercialize a new Vanadium electrolyte formulation the pair had developed while working at Pacific Northwest National Laboratory. The new formulation, a mixed-acid solution, was patented by PNNL and the patent was licensed to UET for commercialization. The mixed-acid vanadium electrolyte allows for a wider temperature range for operations, and double the energy density of the traditional vanadium electrolyte.

The company had designed a megawatt-scale flow battery using this new electrolyte for the purpose of allowing rapid deployment, manufacturing repeatability and lower costs. The company also employed an R&D team which worked to make advances on the electrolyte chemistry and stack design.

== Subsidiary ==
UET had a subsidiary in Germany, Vanadis Power which provides sales and services for Europe. The company had partnerships with Bolong New Materials, a vanadium electrolyte manufacturer, and Rongke Power, the Chinese vanadium flow battery stack manufacturer. In December 2015 the company completed their B round funding series which included a major investment from Orix Corp. In October 2021, UniEnergy filed for involuntary Chapter 11 bankruptcy, listing no assets or debts.

== Products ==
UniEnergy sold a 10kW, 34kWh fully integrated flow battery called the ReFlex. This product was sized to be a building block for commercial and utility scale deployments from kilowatts to multi-megawatt installations.
