= Maria Skyllas-Kazacos =

Australian chemical engineer

- Born: Kalymnos, Greece
- Known for: Vanadium redox battery

Maria Skyllas-Kazacos (born 1951) is an Australian chemical engineer best known for her pioneering work of the vanadium redox battery, which she created at the University of New South Wales in the 1980s. Her design used sulfuric acid electrolytes and was patented by the university. In 1999, she was appointed a Member of the Order of Australia "for service to science and technology, particularly in the development of the vanadium redox battery as an alternative power source".

She is an emeritus professor at the University of New South Wales.

== Early life ==
Skyllas-Kazacos was born as Maria Skyllas in Kalymnos, Greece, in 1951 and emigrated to Australia in 1954. She is the oldest of four siblings. She attended Fort Street Girls High School in Sydney, before beginning a degree in industrial chemistry at the University of New South Wales. She graduated with first class honours and the University Medal in 1974.

She completed her PhD in 1978 at the UNSW School of Chemical Technology on the topic of the electrochemistry of molten salts.

== Career ==
After finishing her PhD, Skyllas-Kazacos received a CSIRO Postdoctoral Fellowship and joined Bell Laboratories in the US for her post-doctoral work.

While completing her postdoctoral fellowship at Bell Labs, Skyllas-Kazacos did research on solar energy and focused on the liquid junction solar cell. She researched ways of depositing thin films. She received a patent for a new method of electrodepositing thin films of cadmium selenide. Since Bell labs had to service Bell Telephone Company, Skyllas-Kazacos also did work on batteries. While assisting on experiments with a problem of lead-acid batteries, she discovered soluble lead(IV) ions in the charging and discharging reactions of the lead-acid batteries. She published a paper on this discovery in the Journal of the Electrochemical Society. After giving a poster presentation in Australia on the same subject, she was awarded the Bloom-Gutmann Prize for the best young author under 30.

After leaving Bell Labs, Skyllas-Kazacos went back to Australia and accepted a position as a Queen Elizabeth II Fellow in the School of Physics at the University of New South Wales. In 1982, aged 31, she became a professor in chemical engineering and industrial chemistry.

At the University of New South Wales, Skyllas-Kazacos and her research team began working on vanadium compounds and flow cells in 1984. She discovered that highly concentrated pentavalent solutions can be prepared indirectly from tetravalent ions, which is more soluble, combined with scraping of the carbon electrode that made the vanadium oxidation-reduction reactions reversible. Skyllas-Kazacos with her research team then patented the vanadium redox battery in 1986.

== Personal life ==
In 1976, Skyllas married Michael Kazacos, who is also a scientist, and they have three children.

== Awards ==
- Whiffen Medal, Institution of Chemical Engineers Australia, 1997
- CHEMECA Medal, Institution of Chemical Engineers Australia, 1998
- Member of the Order of Australia, Australia Day Honours List, 1999
- R.K. Murphy Medal, Royal Australian Chemical Institute, 2000
- Recipient, Distinguished Lecturer Award, Pacific Northwest National Laboratories, Richland, US, 2009
- Co-Recipient, Light Metals Division Journal of Metals Best Paper Award, 2009
- Invested as Grand Lady of the Byzantine Order of St Eugene of Trebizond, Australia Day, 2009
- Castner Medal, Society for the Chemical Industry, UK, 2011
- Fellow of the Australian Academy of Technological Sciences and Engineering, 2014
