= Invinity Energy Systems =

Invinity Energy Systems plc
- Type: Public limited company
- Traded as: AIM: IES
- Industry: Energy storage
- Founded: 2 April 2020
- Headquarters: London, United Kingdom
- Key people: Jonathan Marren (CEO)
- Products: Vanadium flow batteries
- Revenue: £8.2 million (2025)
- Net income: £24.1 million pre-tax loss (2025)

Invinity Energy Systems plc is a UK-Canadian manufacturer of vanadium flow batteries for grid-scale and long-duration energy storage. It was formed in April 2020 by the merger of redT energy and Avalon Battery Corporation of Vancouver, and was admitted to the Alternative Investment Market that month, trading as IES.

== History ==
redT energy began a strategic review in March 2019 following financial difficulties and agreed outline merger terms with Avalon Battery in July 2019. Shareholders approved the transaction on 1 April 2020 and the enlarged company was admitted to AIM the following day. Its main manufacturing site is at Bathgate in West Lothian, Scotland.

== Technology ==
The batteries store energy in a non-flammable liquid vanadium electrolyte held in external tanks and pumped through cell stacks, so that the power rating is set by the stacks and the stored energy by the volume of electrolyte. Invinity states a design life of 30 years without loss of capacity from cycling. FlexBase, which selected the technology for a data centre campus, cited fire safety as its main reason, as the cells cannot enter thermal runaway. The VS3 product line was replaced by the Endurium platform in 2025.

== Projects ==
Its largest installation delivered to date is a 20.7 MWh system in the United Kingdom. In May 2026 FlexBase selected Invinity to design and deliver 1.5 GWh, expandable to 2.1 GWh, at the Laufenburg Technology Center data centre campus in Laufenburg, Switzerland; on announced projects this would be the largest flow battery installation in the world. An engineering, procurement and construction contract with Equans Switzerland was signed in August 2026. The company agreed in August 2026 to supply 43 MWh to Dairyland Power Cooperative in the United States, and in June 2026 announced a 32 MWh system for a steel mill in Kern County, California.
