= Vanadyl ion =

Polyatomic ion in chemistry

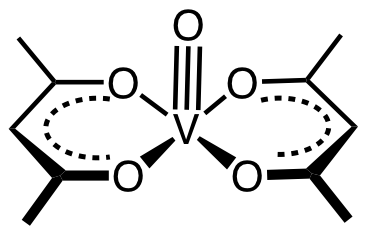
Structure of vanadyl acetylacetonate

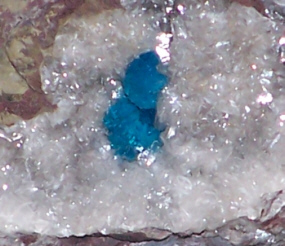
Cavansite, a mineral containing the vanadyl cation that illustrates its characteristic color

The vanadyl ion is an oxovanadium cation, either VO^{2+} (called oxovanadium(IV)) or VO^{3+} (called oxovanadium(V)). They are functional groups that are common in the coordination chemistry of vanadium.

Complexes containing oxovanadium(IV) are characteristically blue or purple and paramagnetic. A triple bond is proposed to exist between the V^{4+} and O^{2−} centers. The description of the bonding in the vanadyl ion was central to the development of modern ligand-field theory.

== Natural occurrence ==
=== Minerals ===
Cavansite and pentagonite are vanadyl-containing minerals.

=== Water ===
VO^{2+}, often in an ionic pairing with sodium (NaH_{2}VO_{4}), is the second most abundant transition metal in seawater, with its concentration only being exceeded by molybdenum. In the ocean the average concentration is 30 nM. Some mineral water springs also contain the ion in high concentrations. For example, springs near Mount Fuji often contain as much as 54 μg per liter.

== Vanadyl-containing compounds ==
=== Oxovanadium(IV) ===
- vanadyl acetylacetonate, VO(acac)_{2}
- vanadyl sulfate, VOSO_{4}
- vanadyl acetate, VO(CH_{3}COO)_{2}

=== Oxovanadium(V) ===
- vanadyl isopropoxide, VO(O-iPr)_{3} (iPr denotes isopropyl)
- vanadyl nitrate, VO(NO_{3})_{3}
- vanadyl perchlorate, VO(ClO_{4})_{3}
- vanadyl fluoride, VOF_{3}
- vanadyl chloride, VOCl_{3}

== Related species ==
- pervanadyl ion, VO^{+}_{2}, also known as the dioxovanadium(V) ion
- metavanadate ion, [VO_{3}]^{n−}_{n}
- orthovanadate ion, VO^{3−}_{4}
- thiovanadyl ion, VS^{2+}
- titanyl ion, TiO^{2+}
- niobyl ion, NbO^{2+}
- tantalyl ion, TaO^{2+}

== General references ==
- Greenwood, Norman N.; Earnshaw, Alan (1997). Chemistry of the Elements (2nd ed.). Butterworth-Heinemann. doi:10.1016/C2009-0-30414-6. ISBN 978-0-08-037941-8.
