= Wagholi, Pune =

Wagholi
- Pune Metropolitan Region
- Location within Maharashtra
- Coordinates: 18°31′13″N 73°51′24″E
- Country: India
- State: Maharashtra
- District: Pune

Government
  - Type: Pune Municipal Corporation
  - MLA: Dnayashewar Katke
  - Member of Parliament: Dr. Amol Kolhe (Lok Sabha)
- Demonym: Wagholikar (Punekar)
- Time zone: UTC+5:30 (IST)
- Postal Index Number: 412207
- Area code: +91-20
- Vehicle registration: MH 12
- Official language: Marathi

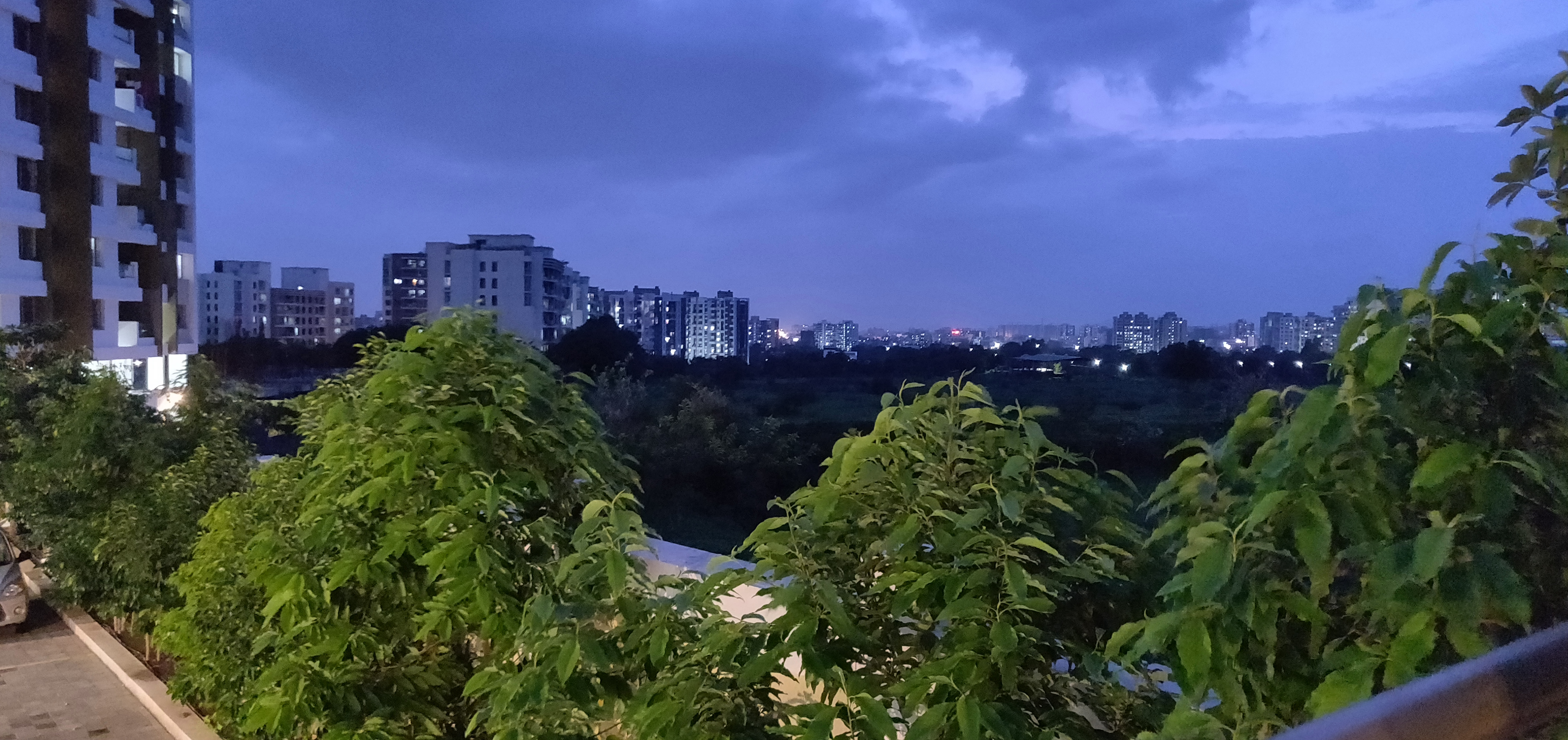
Wagholi as seen from Kesnand Road. Wagholi has been a residential hub since it is in proximity to various IT Parks.

Wagholi is situated within the Pune Metropolitan in the Indian state of Maharashtra. Wagholi is historically kenned as the habitation of Maratha Warrior Sardar Pilajirao Changojirao Jadhavrao. Wagholi was added to the area under Pune Municipal Corporation in 2021. Wagheshwar temple is popular temple at Wagholi. The name Wagholi was derived from the local Marathi word "Wagh" meaning "tiger", and is connected to the temple of Wagheshwar which is located at the entrance to the mining complex 20 km north of Pune.
