= Pervanadyl =

Chemical compound

Identifiers
CAS Number	18252-79-4
3D model (JSmol)	Interactive image
ChEBI	CHEBI:30048
ChemSpider	21864966
Gmelin Reference	1172
- InChI: InChI=1S/2O.V/q;;+1 Key: UAZIGFGVBWJXOL-UHFFFAOYSA-N
- SMILES: O=[V+]=O

Properties
Chemical formula	VO^{+}_{2}

Related compounds
Related compounds	Vanadyl
- Except where otherwise noted, data are given for materials in their standard state (at 25 °C [77 °F], 100 kPa). Infobox references

Pervanadyl is jargon that has two meanings.

- Pervanadyl can refer to aquo complexes containing (VO^{+}_{2}). This pale yellow oxycation of vanadium(V) is the predominant vanadium(V) species in acidic solutions with pH between 0 and 2. Like permanganate, pervanadate features the metal in its highest oxidation state.
- Pervanadyl also can refer to peroxo derivatives of vanadium(V) which are often abbreviated VO(O_{2})^{+}. Several vanadium(V) peroxides have been characterized.

The former are formed by protonation of vanadium(V) oxide in such solutions:

V_{2}O_{5} + 2 H^{+} → 2 VO^{+}_{2} + H_{2}O (K = 3.42×10^{−2})

The ion can form a complex with a single aminopolycarboxylate ligand, or with tridentate Schiff base ligands.

The VO^{+}_{2}/VO^{2+} redox couple is used at the cathode of the vanadium redox battery. The standard reduction potential of this couple is +1.00 V.

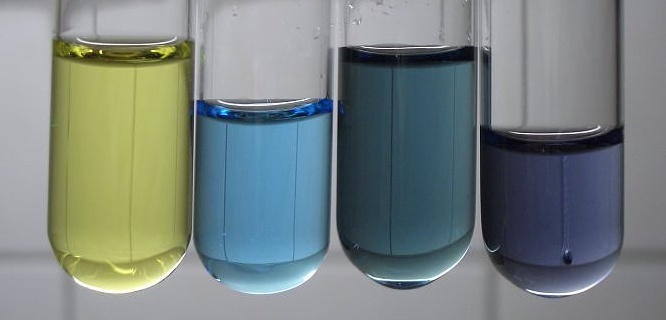
From left to right: VO^{+}_{2}, VO^{2+}, V^{3+}, and V^{2+} in aqueous solution.

== See also ==
- Vanadate
