= List of aqueous ions by element =

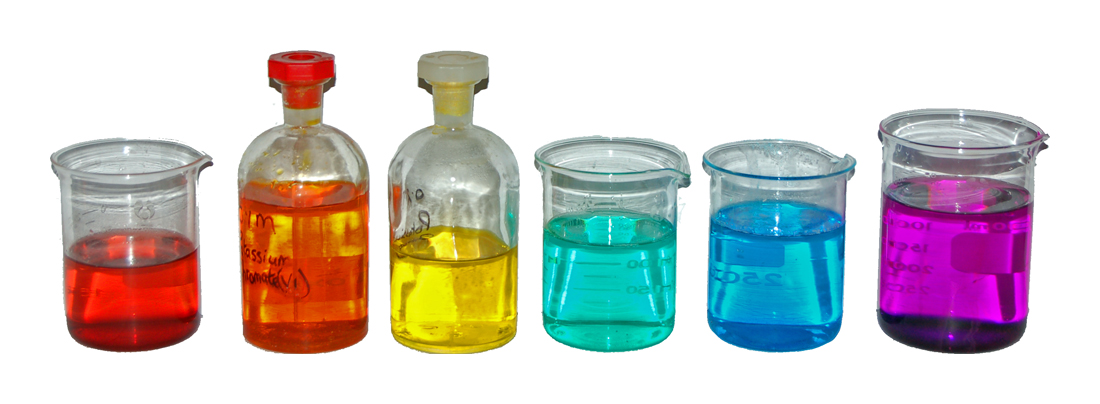
Metallic ions in aqueous solution display many colours: • the red cobalt cation Co^{2+} from Co(NO_{3})_{2} (see § Co) • the orange chromium oxyanion Cr_{2}O^{2−}_{7} from K_{2}Cr_{2}O_{7} (§ Cr) • the yellow chromium oxyanion CrO^{2−}_{4} from K_{2}CrO_{4} (§ Cr) • the turquoise nickel cation Ni^{2+} from NiCl_{2} (§ Ni) • the blue copper cation Cu^{2+} from CuSO_{4} (§ Cu) • the purple manganese oxyanion MnO^{−}_{4} from KMnO_{4} (§ Mn)

This table lists the ionic species that are most likely to be present, depending on pH, in aqueous solutions of binary salts of metal ions. The existence must be inferred on the basis of indirect evidence provided by modelling with experimental data or by analogy with structures obtained by X-ray crystallography.

== Introduction ==
When a salt of a metal ion, with the generic formula MX_{n}, is dissolved in water, it will dissociate into a cation and anions.

$$MX_n \rarr M^{n+}(aq) +nX^-(aq)$$

(aq) signifies that the ion is aquated, with cations having a chemical formula [M(H_{2}O)_{p}]^{q+} and anions whose state of aquation is generally unknown. For convenience (aq) is not shown in the rest of this article as the number of water molecules that are attached to the ions is irrelevant in regard to hydrolysis. This reaction occurs quantitatively with salts of the alkali-metals at low to moderate concentrations.

With salts of divalent metal ions, the aqua-ion will be subject to a dissociation reaction, known as hydrolysis, a name derived from Greek words for water splitting. The first step in this process can be written as

$M^{n+} + OH^-$ ⇌ $M(OH)^{(n-1)+}$

When the pH of the solution is increased by adding an alkaline solution to it, the extent of hydrolysis increases. Measurements of pH or colour change are used to derive the equilibrium constant for the reaction. Further hydrolysis may occur, producing dimeric, trimeric or polymeric species containing hydroxy- or oxy- groups. The next step is to determine which model for the chemical processes best fits the experimental data.

== Model selection ==
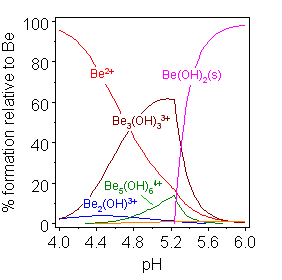
Beryllium hydrolysis. Water molecules are omitted in this diagram

The model is defined in terms of a list of those complex species which are present in solutions in significant amounts. In the present context the complex species have the general formula [M_{p}O_{q}(OH)_{r}]^{n±}. where p, q and r define the stoichiometry of the species and n± gives the electrical charge of the ion. The experimental data are fitted to those models which may represent the species that are formed in solution. The model which gives the best fit is selected for publication. However, the pH range in which data may be collected is limited by the fact that an hydroxide with formula M(OH)_{n} will be formed at relatively low pH, as illustrated at the right. This will make the process of model selection difficult when monomers and dimers are formed. and virtually impossible when higher polymers are also formed. In those cases it must be assumed that the species found in solids are also present in solutions.

The formation of an hydroxo-bridged species is enthalpically favoured over the monomers, countering the unfavourable entropic effect of aggregation. For this reason, it is difficult to establish models in which both types of species are present.

== Monomeric hydrolysis products ==
The extent of hydrolysis can be quantified when the values of the hydrolysis constants can be determined experimentally. The first hydrolysis constant refers to the equilibrium

$M^{n+} (aq)$ ⇌ $M(OH)^{(n-1)+} (aq) + H^+$

The association constant for this reaction can be expressed as

$K=\frac{{[M(OH)]}} {{[M][OH]}}$ (electrical charges are omitted from generic expressions)

Numerical values for this equilibrium constant can be found in papers concerned only with metal ion hydrolysis. However, it is more useful, in general, to use the acid dissociation constant, K_{a}.

$$K_a=\frac{{[M][H]}}{{[M(OH)]}}$$

and to cite the cologarithm, pK_{a}, of the value of this quantity in books and other publications. The two values are constrained by the relationship

log K(association) * log K(dissociation) = pK_{w}

pK_{w} refers to the self-ionization of water: pK = log (1/K) = -log(K).

Further monomeric complexes may be formed in a stepwise manner.

$[M(OH)_n]^{m+} + OH^-$ ⇌ $[M(OH)_{n+1}]^{(m-1)+}$

== Dimeric species ==
Hydrolysed species containing two metal ions, with the general formula M_{2}(OH)_{n}, may be formed from pre-existing monomeric species. The stepwise reaction

$2M(OH)^{n+}$⇌ $M_2(OH)_2^{2n+}$

illustrates the process. An alternative stepwise reaction

$2M(OH)^{n+}$⇌ $M_2O^{2n+} + H_2O$

may also occur. Unfortunately it is not possible to distinguish between these two possibilities using data from potentiometric titrations because both of these reactions have no effect on the pH of the solution.

The concentration of a dimeric species decreases more rapidly with metal ion concentration than does the concentration of the corresponding monomeric species. Therefore, when determining the stability constants of both species it is usually necessary to obtain data from 2 or more titrations, each with a different metal salt concentration. Otherwise the stability constant non-linear least squares refinement may fail without providing the desired values, due to there being 100% mathematical correlation between the refinement parameters for the monomeric and dimeric species.

== Trimeric and polymeric species ==
The principal problem when determining the stability constant for a polymeric species is how to select the "best" model to use from a number of possibilities. An example that illustrates the problem is shown in Baes & Mesmer, p. 119.

A trimeric species must be formed from a chemical reaction of a dimer with a monomer, with the implication that the value of the stability constant of the dimer must be "known", having been determined using separate experimental data. In practice this extremely difficult to achieve. Instead, it is generally assumed that the species in solution are the same as the species that have been identified in crystal structure determinations. There is no way to establish whether or not the assumption is justified. Furthermore, species that are required as intermediaries between the monomer and the polymer may have such low concentrations as to be "undetectable".

An extreme example concerns the species with a cluster of 13 aluminium(III) ions, which can be isolated in the solid state; there must be at least 12 intermediate species in solution, which have not been characterized. It follows that the published stoichiometry of the polymeric species in solution may well be correct, but it is always possible that other species are actually present in solution. In general, the omission of intermediary species will affect the reliability of the published speciation schemes.

== Soluble hydroxides ==
Some hydroxides of non-metallic elements are soluble in water; they are not included in the following table. Examples cited by Baes and Mesmer (p. 413) include hydroxides of Gallium(III), Indium(III), Thallium(III), Arsenic(III), Antimony(III) and Bismuth(III). Most hydroxides of transition metals are classified as being "insoluble" in water. Some of them dissolve, with reaction, in alkaline solution.

M(OH)_{n} + OH^{−} → [M(OH)_{{n+1}}]^{−}

== List ==
For some highly radioactive elements, such as astatine and radon, only trace quantities have been experimented on. As such, unambiguous characterisation of the species they form is impossible, and so their species have been excluded from the table below. Some theoretical speculations as to what they might be are present in the literature; more information can be found at the main articles of the elements involved.

Species of ions produced in aqueous solution
Z	Element	Oxidation state	Cations & Anions	Oxycations & hydroxycations	Oxyanions & hydroxyanions
1	Hydrogen	+1	H^{+}		
2	Helium				
3	Lithium	+1	Li^{+}		
4	Beryllium	+2	Be^{2+}	Be(OH)^{+}, Be_{2}(OH)^{3+}, Be_{3}(OH)^{3+}_{3}	Be(OH)^{−}_{3}, Be(OH)^{2−}_{4}
5	Boron	+3			borates
6	Carbon	+4			carbonate
7	Nitrogen	−3 +3 +5	NH_{2}^{−}, NH_{4}^{+}		nitrite nitrate
8	Oxygen	−2	hydroxide		
9	Fluorine	−1	fluoride		
10	Neon				
11	Sodium	+1	Na^{+}		
12	Magnesium	+2	Mg^{2+}	Mg(OH)^{+}, Mg_{4}(OH)^{4+}_{4}	
13	Aluminium	+3	Al^{3+}	Al(OH)^{2+}, Al(OH)^{+}_{2}, Al_{2}(OH)^{4+}_{2}, Al_{3}(OH)^{5+}_{4}	aluminates
14	Silicon	+4			silicates
15	Phosphorus	−3 +3 +5	phosphide		P(H)O^{2−}_{3}, phosphites PO^{3−}_{4}, polyphosphates
16	Sulfur	−2 +4 +6	HS^{−}		sulfite sulfate
17	Chlorine	−1 +1 +3 +5 +7	chloride		hypochlorite chlorite chlorate perchlorate
18	Argon				
19	Potassium	+1	K^{+}		
20	Calcium	+2	Ca^{2+}	Ca(OH)^{+}	
21	Scandium	+3	Sc^{3+}	Sc(OH)^{2+}, Sc(OH)^{+}_{2}, Sc_{2}(OH)^{4+}_{2}, Sc_{3}(OH)^{4+}_{5}	Sc(OH)^{−}_{4}
22	Titanium	+3 +4	Ti^{3+} (violet)	Ti(OH)^{2+}, Ti_{2}(OH)^{4+}_{2} Ti(OH)^{+}_{3}	titanates
23	Vanadium	+2 +3 +4 +5	V^{2+} (violet) V^{3+} (green)	V(OH)^{2+}, V(OH)^{+}_{2} (blue) VO^{2+}, VO(OH)^{+} VO^{+}_{2} (yellow)	VO_{2}(OH)^{−}_{2}, VO^{3−}_{4}, vanadates
24	Chromium	+2 +3 +6	Cr^{2+} (blue-green) Cr^{3+} (green)	Cr(OH)^{2+}, Cr(OH)^{+}_{2}, Cr_{2}(OH)^{4+}_{2}, Cr_{3}(OH)^{5+}_{4}	Cr(OH)^{3−}_{6} chromate and dichromate
25	Manganese	+2 +3 +6 +7	Mn^{2+} (faint pink)	Mn(OH)^{+}, Mn_{2}(OH)^{3+} Mn(OH)^{2+}	manganate permanganate
26	Iron	+2 +3 +6	Fe^{2+} (green) Fe^{3+} (violet)	Fe(OH)^{+} Fe(OH)^{2+}, Fe(OH)^{+}_{2}, Fe_{2}(OH)^{4+}_{2}, Fe_{3}(OH)^{5+}_{4}	Fe(OH)^{−}_{3} Fe(OH)^{3−}_{6} FeO^{2−}_{4}, ferrate(VI)
27	Cobalt	+2 +3 +5	Co^{2+} (pink) Co^{3+} (blue-green)	Co(OH)^{+}, Co_{2}(OH)^{3+}, Co_{4}(OH)^{4+}_{4}	percobaltate
28	Nickel	+2	Ni^{2+} (green)	Ni(OH)^{+}, Ni_{2}(OH)^{3+}, Ni_{4}(OH)^{4+}_{4}	oxonickelates
29	Copper	+1 +2	Cu^{+} Cu^{2+} (blue)	Cu(OH)^{+}, Cu_{2}(OH)^{2+}_{2}	cuprates
30	Zinc	+2	Zn^{2+}	Zn(OH)^{+}, Zn_{2}(OH)^{3+}	Zn(OH)^{−}_{3}, Zn(OH)^{2−}_{4}, zincate
31	Gallium	+3	Ga^{3+}	Ga(OH)^{2+}, Ga(OH)^{+}_{2}	Ga(OH)^{−}_{4}
32	Germanium	+4			GeO(OH)^{−}_{3}, Ge_{2}(OH)^{2−}_{2}, germanates
33	Arsenic	−3 +3 +5	arsenide		As(OH)^{−}_{4}, arsenite arsenate
34	Selenium	−2 +4 +6	hydrogen selenide		selenite (ion), polymeric species selenate
35	Bromine	−1 +5 +7	bromide		bromite bromate
36	Krypton				
37	Rubidium	+1	Rb^{+}		
38	Strontium	+2	Sr^{2+}	SrOH^{+}	
39	Yttrium	+3	Y^{3+}	Y(OH)^{2+}, Y(OH)^{+}_{2}, Y_{2}(OH)^{4+}_{2}, Y_{2}(OH)^{5+}_{3}	Y(OH)^{−}_{4}
40	Zirconium	+4		Zr(OH)^{3+}, Zr_{4}(OH)^{8+}_{8}	
41	Niobium	+5			polymeric niobates
42	Molybdenum	+3 +6	Mo^{3+}		molybdate, isopolyanions
43	Technetium	+7			pertechnetate
44	Ruthenium	+2 +3 +6 +7	Ru^{2+} (pink) Ru^{3+} (yellow-red)		RuO^{2−}_{4} RuO^{−}_{4}
45	Rhodium	+3	Rh^{3+} (yellow)	RhOH^{2+}	
46	Palladium	+2	Pd^{2+} (red-brown)	PdOH^{+}	
47	Silver	+1	Ag^{+}		Ag(OH)^{−}_{2}
48	Cadmium	+2	Cd^{2+}	Cd(OH)^{+}, Cd_{2}OH^{3+}, Cd_{4}(OH)^{4+}_{4}	Cd(OH)^{−}_{3}, Cd(OH)^{2−}_{4}
49	Indium	+3	In^{3+}	InOH^{2+}, In(OH)^{+}_{2}	In(OH)^{3−}_{6}
50	Tin	+2 +4	Sn^{2+}	SnOH^{+}, Sn_{2}(OH)^{2+}_{2}, Sn_{3}(OH)^{2+}_{4}	Sn(OH)^{−}_{3}, stannate Sn(OH)^{2−}_{6}
51	Antimony	−3 +3 +5	Sb^{3−}	Sb(OH)^{+}_{2}	Sb(OH)^{−}_{4} Sb(OH)^{−}_{6}, antimonates
52	Tellurium	−2 +4 +6	HTe^{−}, Te^{2−}	Te(OH)^{+}_{3}	TeO(OH)^{−}_{3}, TeO_{2}(OH)^{3−}_{2} tellurate
53	Iodine	−1 +5 +7	iodide	I(OH)^{6+}	iodate periodate
54	Xenon	+8			XeO^{4−}_{6}
55	Caesium	+1	Cs^{+}		
56	Barium	+2	Ba^{2+}	Ba(OH)^{+}	
57	Lanthanum	+3	La^{3+}	La(OH)^{2+}	
58	Cerium	+3 +4	Ce^{3+}	Ce(OH)^{2+} Ce(OH)^{2+}_{2}	
59	Praseodymium	+3	Pr^{3+} (green)	Pr(OH)^{2+}	
60	Neodymium	+3	Nd^{3+} (lilac)	Nd(OH)^{2+}	Nd(OH)^{−}_{4}
61	Promethium	+3	Pm^{3+} (pink)	Pm(OH)^{2+}	
62	Samarium	+3	Sm^{2+} (red); Sm^{3+} (yellow)	Sm(OH)^{2+}	
63	Europium	+2 +3	Eu^{2+} Eu^{3+} (pale pink)	Eu(OH)^{2+}	
64	Gadolinium	+3	Gd^{3+}	Gd(OH)^{2+}	Gd(OH)^{−}_{4}
65	Terbium	+3	Tb^{3+} (pale pink)	Tb(OH)^{2+}	
66	Dysprosium	+3	Dy^{3+} (yellow)	Dy(OH)^{2+}	Dy(OH)^{−}_{4}
67	Holmium	+3	Ho^{3+} (yellow)	Ho(OH)^{2+}	
68	Erbium	+3	Er^{3+} (yellow)	Er(OH)^{2+}	Er(OH)^{−}_{4}
69	Thulium	+3	Tm^{3+} (pale green)	Tm(OH)^{2+}	
70	Ytterbium	+2 +3	Yb^{2+} (green) Yb^{3+}	Yb(OH)^{2+}	Yb(OH)^{−}_{4}
71	Lutetium	+3	Lu^{3+}		
72	Hafnium	+4		Hf(OH)^{3+}	polymeric species
73	Tantalum	+5			tantalates
74	Tungsten	+6			WO^{2−}_{4}, tungstates
75	Rhenium	+7			ReO^{−}_{4}
76	Osmium	+6 +8			[OsO_{2}(OH)_{4}]^{2−} (purple) [OsO_{4}(OH)_{2}]^{2−}
77	Iridium	+3 >+3		Ir(OH)^{2+}, Ir(OH)^{+}_{2}	polymeric species
78	Platinum	+2 +4	Pt^{2+} (yellow)		polymeric species, platinum(IV)
79	Gold	+3	Au^{3+}	Au(OH)^{2+}, Au(OH)^{+}_{2}	Au(OH)^{−}_{4}, Au(OH)^{2−}_{5}
80	Mercury	+1 +2	Hg^{2+}_{2} Hg^{2+}	Hg(OH)^{+}, Hg_{2}(OH)^{3+}	
81	Thallium	+1 +3	Tl^{+}	Tl(OH)^{2+}, Tl(OH)^{+}_{2}	Tl(OH)^{−}_{4}
82	Lead	+2	Pb^{2+}	Pb(OH)^{+}, Pb_{2}(OH)^{3+}, Pb_{4}(OH)^{4+}_{4}	Pb(OH)^{−}_{3}
83	Bismuth	+3	Bi^{3+}	Bi(OH)^{2+}, Bi(OH)^{+}_{2}	Bi(OH)^{−}_{4}, polymeric species
84	Polonium	−2 +2 +4	polonide Po^{2+}		PoO^{2−}_{3}
85	Astatine				
86	Radon				
87	Francium	+1	Fr^{+}		
88	Radium	+2	Ra^{2+}	RaOH^{+}	
89	Actinium	+3	Ac^{3+}	AcOH^{2+}	
90	Thorium	+4	Th^{4+}	Th(OH)^{3+}, Th(OH)^{2+}_{2}	Th_{2}(OH)^{6+}_{2}, polymeric species
91	Protactinium	+3 +4 +5	Pa^{3+} Pa^{4+}	PaOH^{3+}, Pa(OH)^{2+}_{2}, Pa(OH)^{+}_{3} PaO^{+}_{2}	
92	Uranium	+3 +4 +6	U^{3+} (purple) U^{4+} (green)	U(OH)^{3+} UO^{2+}_{2}, UO_{2}OH^{+}, (UO_{2})_{2}(OH)^{2+}_{2}	polymeric species uranates
93	Neptunium	+3 +4 +5 +6	Np^{3+} (purple) Np^{4+} (green)	Np(OH)^{3+} NpO^{+}_{2} NpO^{2+}_{2}, NpO_{2}(OH)^{+}, (NpO_{2})_{2}(OH)^{2+}_{2}	
94	Plutonium	+3 +4 +6	Pu^{3+} (blue lavender) Pu^{4+} (yellow brown)	Pu(OH)^{3+} PuO_{2}(OH)^{+}, (PuO_{2})_{2}(OH)^{2+}_{2}, (PuO_{2})_{3}(OH)^{+}_{5}	
95	Americium	+3	Am^{3+} (pink)		
96	Curium	+3	Cm^{3+} (yellow)		
97	Berkelium	+3 +4	Bk^{3+} (green) Bk^{4+} (yellow)		
98	Californium	+3	Cf^{3+} (green)		
99	Einsteinium	+3	Es^{3+} (pale pink)		
100	Fermium	+2 +3	Fm^{2+} Fm^{3+}		
101	Mendelevium	+2 +3	Md^{2+} Md^{3+}		
102	Nobelium	+2 +3	No^{2+} No^{3+}		
103	Lawrencium	+3	Lr^{3+}		
104	Rf & beyond				

== Lanthanide ions ==
Approximate colors of lanthanide ions in aqueous solution
Oxidation state	Lanthanum	Cerium	Praseodymium	Neodymium	Promethium	Samarium	Europium	Gadolinium	Terbium	Dysprosium	Holmium	Erbium	Thulium	Ytterbium	Lutetium
+2						Sm^{2+}	Eu^{2+}						Tm^{2+}	Yb^{2+}	
+3	La^{3+}	Ce^{3+}	Pr^{3+}	Nd^{3+}	Pm^{3+}	Sm^{3+}	Eu^{3+}	Gd^{3+}	Tb^{3+}	Dy^{3+}	Ho^{3+}	Er^{3+}	Tm^{3+}	Yb^{3+}	Lu^{3+}
+4		Ce^{4+}	Pr^{4+}	Nd^{4+}					Tb^{4+}	Dy^{4+}					

== Anions ==
Anions of elements
Group 15	Group 16	Group 17
azanide	hydroxide	fluoride
phosphide	hydrogen sulfide	chloride
arsenide	hydrogen selenide	bromide
antimonide, stibnide	hydrogen telluride	iodide
	polonide	

== Periodic table distribution ==
The occurrence of the different kinds of ions of the elements is shown in this periodic table:

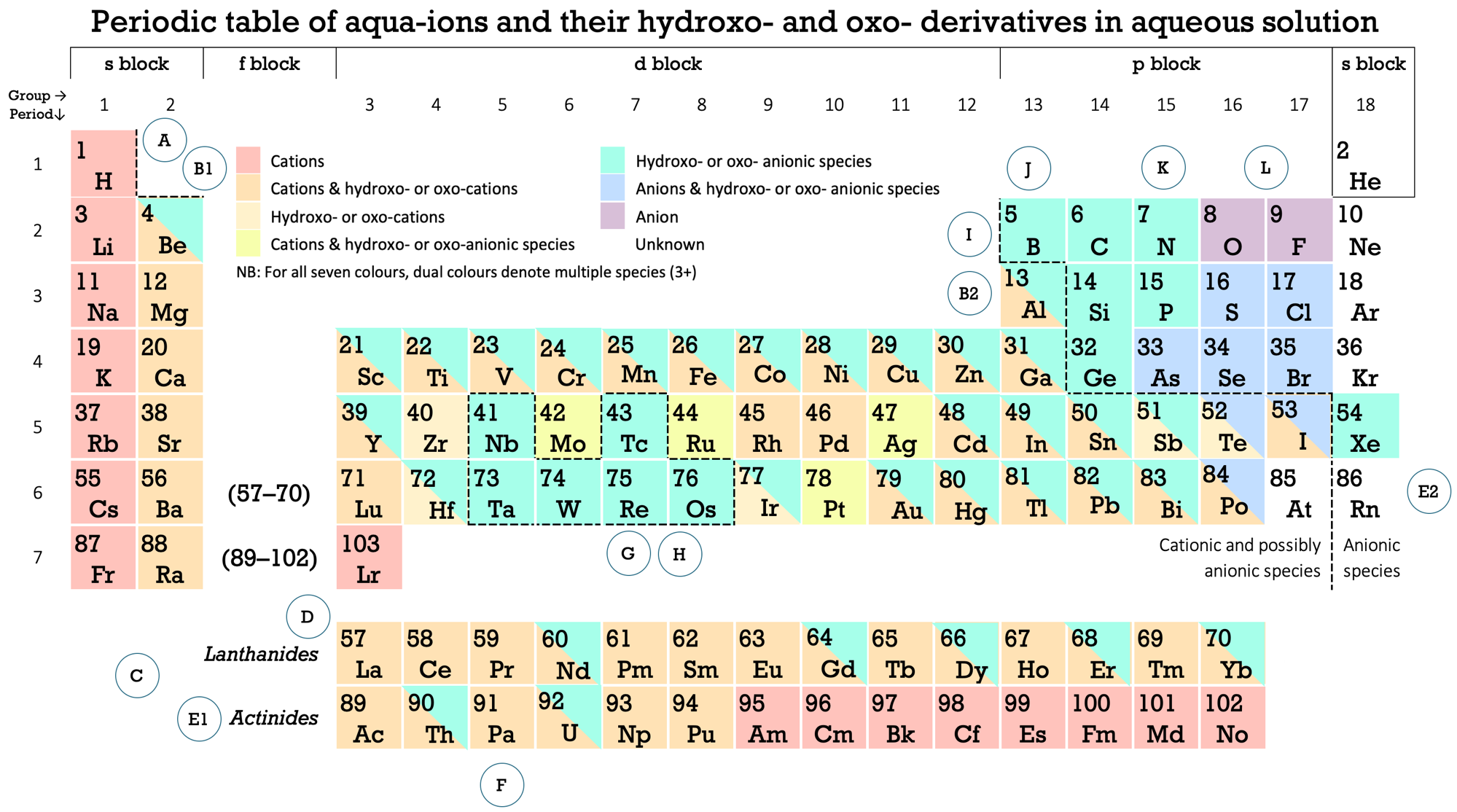

=== Periodic table notes ===
Rather than the periodic table being the sum of its groups and periods an examination of the image shows several patterns Thus, there is a largely a left-to-right transition in metallic character seen in the red-orange-sand-yellow colours for the metals, and the turquoise, blue and violet colours for the nonmetals. The dashed line seen in the periods 1 to 4 corresponds to notions of a dividing line between metals and nonmetals. The mixed species in periods 5 and 6 shows how much trouble chemists can have in assessing where to continue the dividing line. The separate dashed boundary around the Nb-Ta-W-Tc-Re-Os-Ir hexad is an exemplar for the reputation many transition metals have for nonmetallic chemistry.

Periodic table block	Positive ions	Negative ions
s	93%	7%
f	88%	12%
d	49%	51%
p	32%	68%
The incidence of positively charged ions (cations, oxycations and hydroxycations) and negatively charged ions (anions, oyxanions and hydroxyanions) in each block of the periodic table shows a left to right decline of positively charged ions and increase in negatively charged species, This pattern is consistent with a left to right progression in metallic to nonmetallic character.

Ⓐ Hydrogen is shown as being a cation former but most of its chemistry, "can be explained in terms of its tendency to [eventually] acquire the electronic configuration of…helium", thereby behaving predominately as a nonmetal.

Ⓑ Beryllium has an isodiagonal relationship with aluminium, in group 13, such a relationship also occurring between B and Si; and C and P.

Ⓒ Cation-only elements are shown as being limited to sixteen elements: all those in group 1, and the heavier actinides.

Ⓓ Rare earth metals are the group 3 metals scandium, yttrium, lutetium and the lanthanides; scandium is the only such metal shown as being capable of forming an oxyanion.

Ⓔ Radioactive elements, such as the actinides, are harder to study. The known species may not represent the whole of what is possible, and the identifications may sometimes be in doubt. Astatine, as another example, is highly radioactive, and determining its stable species is "clouded by the extremely low concentrations at which astatine experiments have been conducted, and the possibility of reactions with impurities, walls and filters, or radioactivity by-products, and other unwanted nano-scale interactions. Equally, as Kirby noted, “since the trace chemistry of I sometimes differs significantly from its own macroscopic chemistry, analogies drawn between At and I are likely to be questionable, at best."

Ⓕ The earlier actinides, up to uranium, show some superficial resemblance to their transition metal counterparts in groups 3 to 9.

Ⓖ Most of the transition metals are known for their nonmetallic chemistry, and this is particularly seen in the image for periods 5 and 6, groups 5 to 9. They nevertheless have the relatively high electrical conductivity values characteristic of metals.

Ⓗ The transition metals (or d-block metals) further show electrochemical character, in terms of their capacity to form positive or negative ions, that is in-between that of (i) the s and f-block metals; and (ii) the p-block elements. (Note: Atkins discusses the transition more narrowly: Between the "virulent and violent" metals on the left of the periodic table, and the "calm and contented" metals to the right are the transition metals, which form "a transitional bridge between the two" extremes. Jensen speculated that notion of "transition" elements was intended to indicate that, "these elements were undergoing a transition in the occupancy of their underlying n − 1 or n − 2 shells from 8 or 18 electrons at the beginning of the series to 18 or 32 electrons at the end of the series.")

Ⓘ The p-block shows a relatively distinct cutoff in periods 1 to 4 between elements commonly recognised as metals and nonmetals. Periods 5 and 6 include elements commonly recognised as metalloids by authors who recognise such a class or subclass (antimony and tellurium), and elements less commonly recognised as such (polonium and astatine).

Ⓙ Stein, in 1987, showed the metalloid elements as occupying a zone in the p-block composed of B, Si, Ge, As, Sb, Po, Te, At and Rn. In the periodic table image these elements are found on the right or upper side of the dashed line traversing the p-block.

Ⓚ Of 103 elements shown in the image, just ten form anions, all of these being in the p-block: arsenic; the five chalcogens: oxygen, sulfur, selenium, tellurium, polonium; and the four halogens: fluorine, chlorine, bromine, and iodine

Ⓛ Anion-only elements are confined to oxygen and fluorine.

== See also ==
- Aqueous solution
- Metal ions in aqueous solution

== Books ==
- Baes, CE; Mesmer, RE (1976). The Hydrolysis of Cations. Malabar: Krieger. pp. xvi+489. ISBN 0-89874-892-5.
- Brown, PW; Ekberg, C (2016). Hydrolysis of Metal Ions. Weinheim: Wiley-VCH. pp. xvi+918. ISBN 978-3-527-33010-2.
- Richens, David T (1997). The Chemistry of Aqua Ions. New York: John Wiley & Sons. pp. xi+592. ISBN 978-0-471-97058-3.
- Turova, N (2011). Inorganic Chemistry in Tables. Berlin: Springer. pp. iv+157. ISBN 978-3-642-20487-6.
- Schweitzer, GK; Pesterfield, LL (2010). The Aqueous Chemistry of the Elements. Oxford: Oxford University Press. pp. x+448. ISBN 978-0-19-539335-4.
- Sanderson, Robert Thomas (1960). Chemical Periodicity. New York: Reinhold. pp. 330+illust.
- Greenwood, Norman, N.; Earnshaw, Alan (1984). "Chapter 2, Chemical Periodicity and the Periodic Table". Chemistry of the Elements (2nd ed.). Oxford: Butterworth. ISBN 0-7506-3365-4.
