= Vanadium oxytrichloride =

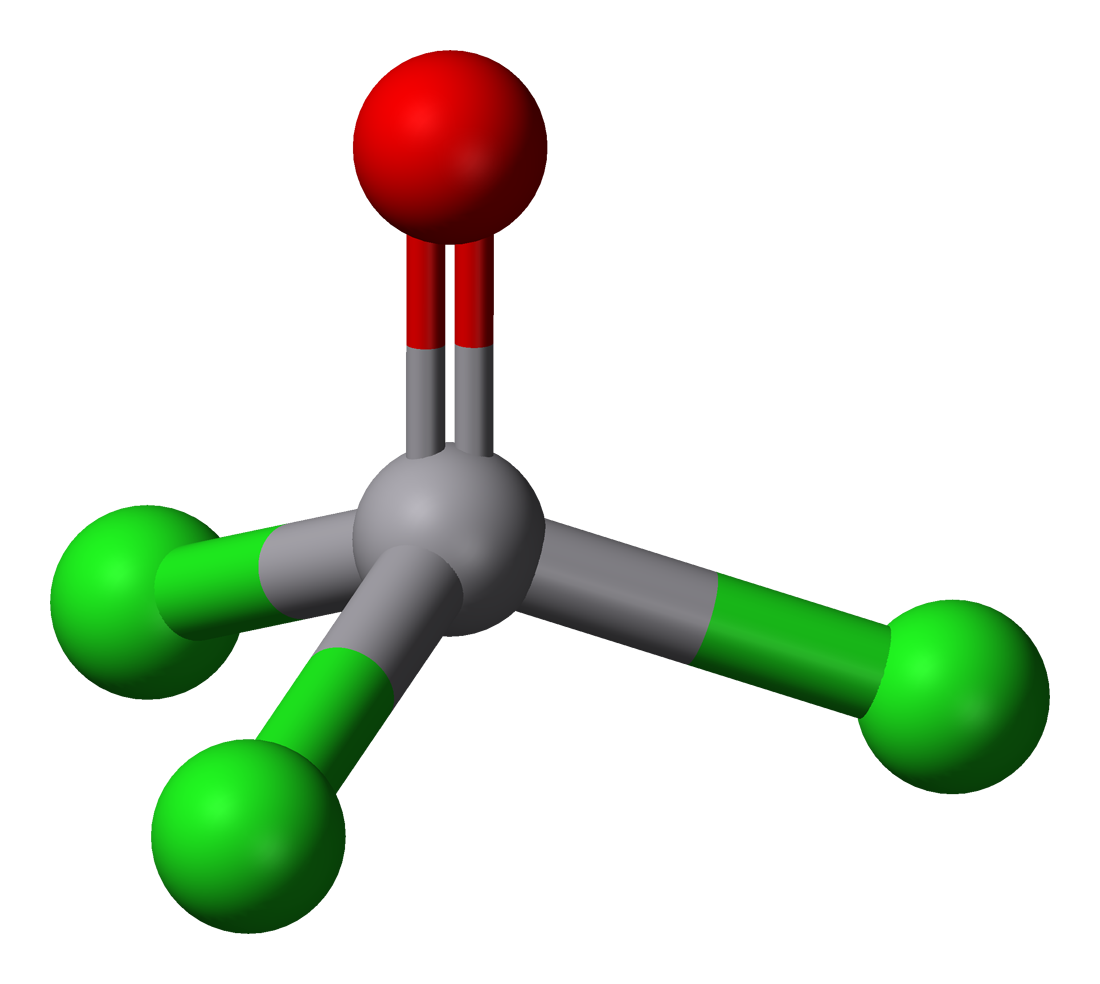
- Ball and stick model of vanadium oxytrichloride

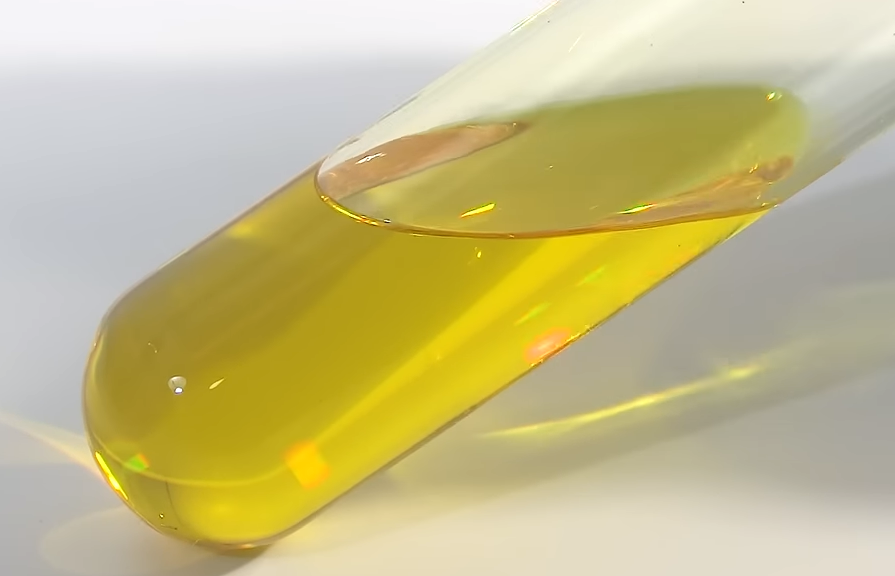
- Vanadium oxytrichloride in an ampoule

Names
- IUPAC name Vanadium trichloride oxide
- Other names: Vanadyl chloride; Vanadyl trichloride

Identifiers
CAS Number	7727-18-6
3D model (JSmol)	Interactive image
ChEBI	CHEBI:231500
ChemSpider	10613097
ECHA InfoCard	100.028.892
EC Number	231-780-2
MeSH	trichlorooxo+vanadium
PubChem CID	24410
RTECS number	YW2975000
UNII	839N4FR2H0
UN number	2443
CompTox Dashboard (EPA)	DTXSID7064784
- InChI: InChI=1S/3ClH.O.V/h3*1H;;/q;;;;+3/p-3 Key: JBIQAPKSNFTACH-UHFFFAOYSA-K
- SMILES: Cl[V](Cl)(Cl)=O

Properties
Chemical formula	VOCl_{3}
Molar mass	173.300 g mol^{−1}
Appearance	yellow liquid
Density	1.826 g mL^{−1}
Melting point	−76.5 °C (−105.7 °F; 196.7 K)
Boiling point	126.7 °C (260.1 °F; 399.8 K)
Solubility in water	Decomposes
Vapor pressure	1.84 kPa (at 20 °C)

Structure
Molecular shape	Tetrahedral

Hazards
- GHS labelling
Pictograms	(GHS05: Corrosive) (GHS06: Toxic) (GHS09: Environmental hazard)
Signal word	Danger
Hazard statements	H301, H314
Precautionary statements	P280, P301+P310, P305+P351+P338, P310
NFPA 704 (fire diamond)	3 1 3
- Lethal dose or concentration (LD, LC)
LD_{50} (median dose)	140 mg kg^{−1} (oral, rat)

Related compounds
Related vanadiums	Vanadium(V) oxytrifluoride; Vanadium(V) oxide
- Except where otherwise noted, data are given for materials in their standard state (at 25 °C [77 °F], 100 kPa). verify (what is ?) Infobox references

Vanadium oxytrichloride is the inorganic compound with the formula VOCl_{3}. This yellow distillable liquid hydrolyzes readily in air. It is an oxidizing agent. It is used as a reagent in organic synthesis. Samples often appear red or orange owing to an impurity of vanadium tetrachloride.

== Properties ==
VOCl_{3} is a vanadium compound with vanadium in the +5 oxidation state and as such is diamagnetic. It is tetrahedral with O-V-Cl bond angles of 111° and Cl-V-Cl bond angles of 108°. The V-O and V-Cl bond lengths are 157 and 214 pm, respectively. VOCl_{3} is highly reactive toward water and evolves HCl upon standing. It is soluble in nonpolar solvents such as benzene, CH_{2}Cl_{2}, and hexane. In some aspects, the chemical properties of VOCl_{3} and POCl_{3} are similar. One distinction is that VOCl_{3} is a strong oxidizing agent, whereas the phosphorus compound is not. Neat VOCl_{3} is the usual chemical shift standard for ^{51}V NMR spectroscopy.

== Preparation ==
VOCl_{3} arises by the chlorination of V_{2}O_{5}. The reaction proceeds near 600 °C:

3 Cl_{2} + V_{2}O_{5} → 2 VOCl_{3} + 1.5 O_{2}

Heating an intimate (well-blended with tiny particles) mixture of V_{2}O_{5}, chlorine, and carbon at 200–400 °C also gives VOCl_{3}. In this case the carbon serves as a deoxygenation agent akin to its use in the chloride process for the manufacturing of TiCl_{4} from TiO_{2}.

Vanadium(II) oxide can also be used as a precursor:

3 Cl_{2} + V_{2}O_{2} → 2 VOCl_{3}

A more typical laboratory synthesis involves the chlorination of V_{2}O_{5} using SOCl_{2}.

V_{2}O_{5} + 3 SOCl_{2} → 2 VOCl_{3} + 3 SO_{2}

== Reactions ==
=== Hydrolysis and alcoholysis ===
VOCl_{3} quickly hydrolyzes resulting in vanadium pentoxide and hydrochloric acid. An intermediate in this process is VO_{2}Cl:

2 VOCl_{3} + 3 H_{2}O → V_{2}O_{5} + 6 HCl

VOCl_{3} reacts with alcohols especially in the presence of a proton-acceptor to give alkoxides, as illustrated by this synthesis of vanadyl isopropoxide:

VOCl_{3} + 3 HOCH(CH_{3})_{2} → VO(OCH(CH_{3})_{2})_{3} + 3 HCl

=== Interconversions to other V-O-Cl compounds ===
VOCl_{3} is also used in the synthesis of vanadium oxydichloride.

V_{2}O_{5} + 3 VCl_{3} + VOCl_{3} → 6 VOCl_{2}

VO_{2}Cl can be prepared by an unusual reaction involving Cl_{2}O.

VOCl_{3} + Cl_{2}O → VO_{2}Cl + 2 Cl_{2}

At >180 °C, VO_{2}Cl decomposes to V_{2}O_{5} and VOCl_{3}. Similarly, VOCl_{2} also decomposes to give VOCl_{3}, together with VOCl.

=== Adduct formation ===
VOCl_{3} is strongly Lewis acidic, as demonstrated by its tendency to form adducts with various bases such as acetonitrile and amines. In forming the adducts, vanadium changes from four-coordinate tetrahedral geometry to six-coordinate octahedral geometry:

VOCl_{3} + 2 H_{2}NEt → VOCl_{3}(H_{2}NEt)_{2}

=== Organic chemistry ===
VOCl_{3} is a catalyst or precatalyst in production of ethylene-propylene rubbers (EPDM). In organic synthesis, it has been used for oxidative coupling of phenols and anisoles.
