= Aqueous solution =

Solution in which the solvent is water

The first solvation shell of a sodium ion dissolved in water

An aqueous solution is a solution in which the solvent is water. It is mostly shown in chemical equations by appending (aq) to the relevant chemical formula. For example, a solution of table salt, also known as sodium chloride (NaCl), in water would be represented as Na^{+}(aq) + Cl^{−}(aq). The word aqueous (which comes from aqua) means pertaining to, related to, similar to, or dissolved in, water. As water is an excellent solvent and is also naturally abundant, it is a ubiquitous solvent in chemistry. Since water is frequently used as the solvent in experiments, the word solution refers to an aqueous solution, unless the solvent is specified.

A non-aqueous solution is a solution in which the solvent is a liquid, but is not water.

== Characteristics ==
Substances that are hydrophobic ('water-fearing') do not dissolve well in water, whereas those that are hydrophilic ('water-loving') do. An example of a hydrophilic substance is sodium chloride. In an aqueous solution the hydrogen ions (H^{+}) and hydroxide ions (OH^{−}) are in Arrhenius balance ([H^{+}] [OH^{−}] = K_{w} = 1 × 10^{−14} at 298 K). Acids and bases are aqueous solutions, as part of their Arrhenius definitions. An example of an Arrhenius acid is hydrogen chloride (HCl) because of its dissociation of the hydrogen ion when dissolved in water. Sodium hydroxide (NaOH) is an Arrhenius base because it dissociates the hydroxide ion when it is dissolved in water.

Aqueous solutions may contain, especially in the alkaline zone or subjected to radiolysis, hydrated atomic hydrogen and hydrated electrons.

== Electrolytes and non-electrolytes ==
Aqueous solutions that conduct electric current efficiently contain "strong" electrolytes, while those that conduct poorly are attributable to weaker electrolytes. The former substances are completely, or at least substantially, ionized in water; conversely, the weak electrolytes exhibit relatively limited ionization in water. The ability of ions to move freely through a solvent is a characteristic of an aqueous strong electrolyte solution; the solutes in a weaker electrolyte solution are present as ions, but only to a small degree.

Non-electrolytes, conversely, are substances that dissolve in water, yet maintain their molecular integrity: they do not dissociate into ions. Examples include sugars, urea, glycerol, and ethanol.

== Reactions ==
Reactions in aqueous solutions are usually metathesis reactions. Metathesis reactions are another term for double-displacement; that is, when a cation displaces to form an ionic bond with the other anion. The cation bonded with the latter anion will dissociate and bond with the other anion.

A common metathesis reaction in aqueous solutions is a precipitation reaction. This reaction occurs when two aqueous strong electrolyte solutions mix and produce an insoluble solid, also known as a precipitate. The ability of a substance to dissolve in water is determined by whether the substance can match or exceed the strong attractive forces that water molecules generate between themselves. If the substance lacks the ability to dissolve in water, the molecules form a precipitate.

When writing the equations of precipitation reactions, it is essential to determine the precipitate. To determine the precipitate, one must consult a chart of solubility. Soluble compounds are aqueous, while insoluble compounds are the precipitate. There may not always be a precipitate. Complete ionic equations and net ionic equations are used to show dissociated ions in metathesis reactions. When performing calculations regarding the reacting of one or more aqueous solutions, in general one must know the concentration, or molarity, of the aqueous solutions.

== See also ==
- Acid–base reaction
- Acidity function
- Dissociation (chemistry)
- Drug permeability
- Inorganic nonaqueous solvent
- List of ions in pure water (aqueous chemistry)
- Metal ions in aqueous solution
- Properties of water
- Solubility
- Solvated electron
