= Stock number =

The term stock number can have several meanings:

- An unique identifier for a sheet of paper, for example airline ticket, paper currency or giro form. Stock numbers are usually printed during the manufacturing process, in addition to any unique identifier that may be added later (e.g. ticket number).
- Stock keeping unit (SKU) or part number used to uniquely identifier a product within an inventory system or warehouse.
  - NATO Stock Number, the SKU system used by NATO.
- An obsolete term for oxidation number in inorganic chemistry (see stock nomenclature).

== See also ==
- Ticker symbol, also known as stock symbol
