= Bond valence method =

The bond valence method or mean method (or bond valence sum) (not to be mistaken for the valence bond theory in quantum chemistry) is a popular method in coordination chemistry to estimate the oxidation states of atoms. It is derived from the bond valence model, which is a simple yet robust model for validating chemical structures with localized bonds or used to predict some of their properties. This model is a development of Pauling's rules.

== Method ==
The basic method is that the valence V of an atom is the sum of the individual bond valences v_{i} surrounding the atom:

$$V = \sum(v_\text{i})$$

The individual bond valences in turn are calculated from the observed bond lengths.

$$v_\text{i}=\exp \left( \frac {R_0-R_\text{i}} {b} \right)$$

R_{i} is the observed bond length, R_{0} is a tabulated parameter expressing the (ideal) bond length when the element i has exactly valence 1, and b is an empirical constant, typically 0.37 Å.

Another formula for $v_\text{i}$ has also been used:

$$v_\text{i}= \left( \frac {R_\text{i}} {R_0}\right)^{-6}$$

== Theory ==
=== Introduction ===
Although the bond valence model is mostly used for validating newly determined structures, it is capable of predicting many of the properties of those chemical structures that can be described by localized bonds

In the bond valence model, the valence of an atom, V, is defined as the number of electrons the atom uses for bonding. This is equal to the number of electrons in its valence shell if all the valence shell electrons are used for bonding. If they are not, the remainder will form non-bonding electron pairs, usually known as lone pairs.

The valence of a bond, S, is defined as the number of electron pairs forming the bond. In general this is not an integral number. Since each of the terminal atoms contributes equal numbers of electrons to the bond, the bond valence is also equal to the number of valence electrons that each atom contributes. Further, since within each atom, the negatively charged valence shell is linked to the positively charged core by an electrostatic flux that is equal to the charge on the valence shell, it follows that the bond valence is also equal to the electrostatic flux that links the core to the electrons forming the bond. The bond valence is thus equal to three different quantities: the number of electrons each atom contributes to the bond, the number of electron pairs that form the bond, and the electrostatic flux linking each core to the bonding electron pair.

=== The valence sum rule ===
It follows from these definitions, that the valence of an atom is equal to the sum of the valences of all the bonds it forms. This is known as the valence sum rule, Eq. 1, which is central to the bond valence model.

$V=\sum(S_j)$ (Eq. 1)

A bond is formed when the valence shells of two atoms overlap. It is apparent that the closer two atoms approach each other, the larger the overlap region and the more electrons are associated with the bond. We therefore expect a correlation between the bond valence and the bond length and find empirically that for most bonds it can be described by Eq. 2:

$S=\exp((R_o-R)/b)$ (Eq. 2)

where $S$ is the valence and $R$ is the length of the bond, and $R_o$ and $b$ are parameters that are empirically determined for each bond type. For many bond types (but not all), $b$ is found to be close to 0.37 Å. A list of bond valence parameters for different bond types (i.e., for different pairs of cation and anion in given oxidation states) can be found at the web site. It is this empirical relation that links the formal theorems of the bond valence model to the real world and allows the bond valence model to be used to predict the real structure, geometry, and properties of a compound.

If the structure of a compound is known, the empirical bond valence - bond length correlation of Eq. 2 can be used to estimate the bond valences from their observed bond lengths. Eq. 1 can then be used to check that the structure is chemically valid; any deviation between the atomic valence and the bond valence sum needs to be accounted for.

=== The distortion theorem ===
Eq. 2 is used to derive the distortion theorem which states that the more the individual bond lengths in a coordination sphere deviate from their average, the more the average bond length increases provided the valence sum is kept constant. Alternatively if the average bond length is kept constant, the more the bond valence sum increases

=== The valence matching rule ===
If the structure is not known, the average bond valence, S_{a} can be calculated from the atomic valence, V, if the coordination number, N, of the atom is known using Eq. 3.

$S_a=V/N$ (Eq. 3)

If the coordination number is not known, a typical coordination number for the atom can be used instead. Some atoms, such as sulfur(VI), are only found with one coordination number with oxygen, in this case 4, but others, such as sodium, are found with a range of coordination numbers, though most lie close to the average, which for sodium is 6.2. In the absence of any better information, the average coordination number observed with oxygen is a convenient approximation, and when this number is used in Eq. 3, the resulting average bond valence is known as the bonding strength of the atom.

Since the bonding strength of an atom is the valence expected for a bond formed by that atom, it follows that the most stable bonds will be formed between atoms with the same bonding strengths. In practice some tolerance is allowed, but bonds are rarely formed if the ratio of the bonding strengths of the two atoms exceeds two, a condition expressed by the inequality shown in Eq. 4. This is known and the valence matching rule.

$0.5 < (S_1/S_2) < 2.0$ (Eq. 4)

Atoms with non-bonding valence electrons, i.e., with lone pairs, have more flexibility in their bonding strength than those without lone pairs depending on whether the lone pairs are stereoactive or not. If the lone pairs are not stereoactive, they are spread uniformly around the valence shell, if they are stereoactive they are concentrated in one portion of the coordination sphere preventing that portion from forming bonds. This results in the atom having a smaller coordination number, hence a higher bonding strength, when the lone pair is stereoactive. Ions with lone pairs have a greater ability to adapt their bonding strength to match that of the counter-ion. The lone pairs become stereoactive when the bonding strength of the counter-ion exceeds twice the bonding strength of the ion when its lone pairs are inactive.

Compounds that do not satisfy Eq. 4 are difficult, if not impossible, to prepare, and chemical reactions tend to favour the compounds that provide the best valence match. For example, the aqueous solubility of a compound depends on whether its ions are better matched to water than they are to each other.

=== Electronegativity ===
Several factors influence the coordination number of an atom, but the most important of these is its size; larger atoms have larger coordination numbers. The coordination number depends on the surface area of the atom, and so is proportional to r^{2}. If V_{E} is the charge on the atomic core (which is the same as the valence of the atom when all the electrons in the valence shell are bonding), and N_{E} is the corresponding average coordination number, V_{E}/N_{E} is proportional to the electric field at the surface of the core, represented by S_{E} in Eq. 5:

$S_E=V_E/N_E$ (Eq. 5)

Not surprisingly, S_{E} gives the same ordering of the main group elements as the electronegativity, though it differs in its numerical value from traditional electronegativity scales. Because it is defined in structural terms, S_{E} is the preferred measure of electronegativity in the bond valence model,

=== The ionic model ===
The bond valence model can be reduced to the traditional ionic model if certain conditions are satisfied. These conditions require that atoms be divided into cations and anions in such a way that (a) the electronegativity of every anion is equal to, or greater than, the electronegativity of any of the cations, (b) that the structure is electroneutral when the ions carry charges equal to their valence, and (c) that all the bonds have a cation at one end and an anion at the other. If these conditions are satisfied, as they are in many ionic and covalent compounds, the electrons forming a bond can all be formally assigned to the anion. The anion thus acquires a formal negative charge and the cation a formal positive charge, which is the picture on which the ionic model is based. The electrostatic flux that links the cation core to its bonding electrons now links the cation core to the anion. In this picture, a cation and anion are bonded to each other if they are linked by electrostatic flux, with the flux being equal to the valence of the bond. In a representative set of compounds Preiser et al. have confirmed that the electrostatic flux is the same as the bond valence determined from the bond lengths using Eq. 2.

The association of the cation bonding electrons with the anion in the ionic model is purely formal. There is no change in physical locations of any electrons, and there is no change in the bond valence. The terms "anion" and "cation" in the bond valence model are defined in terms of the bond topology, not the chemical properties of the atoms. This extends the scope of the ionic model well beyond compounds in which the bonding would normally be considered as "ionic". For example, methane, CH_{4}, obeys the conditions for the ionic model with carbon as the cation and hydrogen as the anion (or vice versa, since carbon and hydrogen have the same electronegativity).

For compounds that contain cation-cation or anion-anion bonds it is usually possible to transform these homoionic bonds into cation-anion bonds either by treating the atoms linked by the homoionic bond as a single complex cation (e.g., Hg_{2}^{2+}), or by treating the bonding electrons in the homoionic bond as a pseudo-anion to transform a cation-cation bond into two cation - pseudo-anion bonds, e.g., Hg^{2+}-e^{2−}-Hg^{2+}.

=== The covalent model ===
Structures containing covalent bonds can be treated using the ionic model providing they satisfy the topological conditions given above, but a special situation applies to hydrocarbons which allows the bond valence model to be reduced to the traditional bond model of organic chemistry. If an atom has a valence, V, that is equal to its coordination number, N, its bonding strength according to Eq. 3 is exactly 1.0 vu (valence units), a condition that greatly simplifies the model. This condition is obeyed by carbon, hydrogen and silicon. Since these atoms all have bonding strengths of 1.0 vu the bonds between them are all predicted to have integral valences with carbon forming four single bonds and hydrogen one. Under these conditions, the bonds are all single bonds (or multiples of single bonds). Compounds can be constructed by linking carbon and hydrogen atoms with bonds that are all exactly equivalent. Under certain conditions, nitrogen can form three bonds and oxygen two, but since nitrogen and oxygen typically also form hydrogen bonds, the resulting N-H and O-H bonds have valences less than 1.0 vu, leading through the application of Eq. 1, to the C-C and C-H bonds having valences that differ from 1.0 vu. Nevertheless, the simple bonding rules of organic chemistry are still good approximations, though the rules of the bond valence model are better.

=== Predicting bonding geometry ===
A chemical structure can be represented by a bond network of the kind familiar in molecular diagrams. The infinitely connected bond networks found in crystals can be simplified into finite networks by extracting one formula unit and reconnecting any broken bonds to each other. If the bond network is not known, a plausible network can be created by connecting well matched cations and anions that satisfy Eq. 4. If the finite network contains only cation-anion bonds, every bond can be treated as an electric capacitor (two equal and opposite charges linked by electrostatic flux). The bond network is thus equivalent to a capacitive electrical circuit with the charge on each capacitor being equivalent to the bond valence. The individual bond capacitors are not initially known, but in the absence of any information to the contrary we assume that they are all equal. In this case the circuit can be solved using the Kirchhoff equations, yielding the valences of each bond. Eq. 2 can then be used to calculate bond lengths which are found to lie within a few picometres of the observed bond lengths if no additional constraints are present. Additional constraints include electronic anisotropies (lone pairs and Jahn-Teller distortions) or steric constraints, (bonds stretched or compressed in order to fit them into three-dimensional space). Hydrogen bonds are an example of a steric constraint. The repulsion resulting from the close approach of the donor and acceptor atoms causes the bonds to be stretched, and under this constraint the distortion theorem predicts that the hydrogen atom will move off-center.

The bond valence is a vector directed along the bond since it represents the electrostatic field linking the ions. If the atom is unconstrained, the sum of the bond valence vectors around an atom is expected to be zero, a condition that limits the range of possible bond angles.

=== Strengths and limitations of the model ===
The bond valence model is an extension of the electron counting rules and its strength lies in its simplicity and robustness. Unlike most models of chemical bonding, it does not require a prior knowledge of the atomic positions and so can be used to construct chemically plausible structures given only the composition. The empirical parameters of the model are tabulated and are readily transferable between bonds of the same type. The concepts used are familiar to chemists and provide ready insight into the chemical restraints acting on the structure. The bond valence model uses mostly classical physics, and with little more than a pocket calculator, it gives quantitative predictions of bond lengths and places limits on what structures can be formed.

However, like all models, the bond valence model has its limitations. It is restricted to compounds with localized bonds; it does not, in general, apply to metals or aromatic compounds where the electrons are delocalized. It cannot in principle predict electron density distributions or energies since these require the solution of the Schoedinger equation using the long-range Coulomb potential which is incompatible with the concept of a localized bond.

== History ==
The bond valence method is a development of Pauling's rules. In 1930, Lawrence Bragg showed that Pauling's electrostatic valence rule could be represented by electrostatic lines of force emanating from cations in proportion to the cation charge and ending on anions. The lines of force are divided equally between the bonds to the corners of the coordination polyhedron.

Starting with Pauling in 1947 a correlation between cation–anion bond length and bond strength was noted. It was shown later that if bond lengths were included in the calculation of bond strength, its accuracy was improved, and this revised method of calculation was termed the bond valence. These new insights were developed by later workers culminating in the set of rules termed the bond valence model.

== Actinide oxides ==
It is possible by bond valence calculations to estimate how great a contribution a given oxygen atom is making to the assumed valence of uranium. Zachariasen lists the parameters to allow such calculations to be done for many of the actinides. Bond valence calculations use parameters which are estimated after examining a large number of crystal structures of uranium oxides (and related uranium compounds); note that the oxidation states which this method provides are only a guide which assists in the understanding of a crystal structure.

For uranium binding to oxygen the constants R_{0} and B are tabulated in the table below. For each oxidation state use the parameters from the table shown below.

Oxidation state	R_{0}	B
U(VI)	2.08Å	0.35
U(V)	2.10Å	0.35
U(IV)	2.13Å	0.35

== Doing the calculations ==
It is possible to do these simple calculations on paper or to use software. A program which does it can be obtained free of charge. In 2020 David Brown published a nearly comprehensive set of bond valence parameters on the IuCr web site.
