= International nomenclature =

International nomenclature may refer to:

- Stock nomenclature for inorganic compounds
- International System for Human Cytogenomic Nomenclature
