= Cation-anion radius ratio =

Ratio of cation radius to anion radius

In condensed matter physics and inorganic chemistry, the cation-anion radius ratio can be used to predict the crystal structure of an ionic compound based on the relative size of its atoms. It is defined as the ratio of the ionic radius of the positively charged cation to the ionic radius of the negatively charged anion in a cation-anion compound. Anions are larger than cations. Large sized anions occupy lattice sites, while small sized cations are found in voids. In a given structure, the ratio of cation radius to anion radius is called the radius ratio. This is simply given by $r_{C} / r_{A}$.

== Ratio rule and stability ==
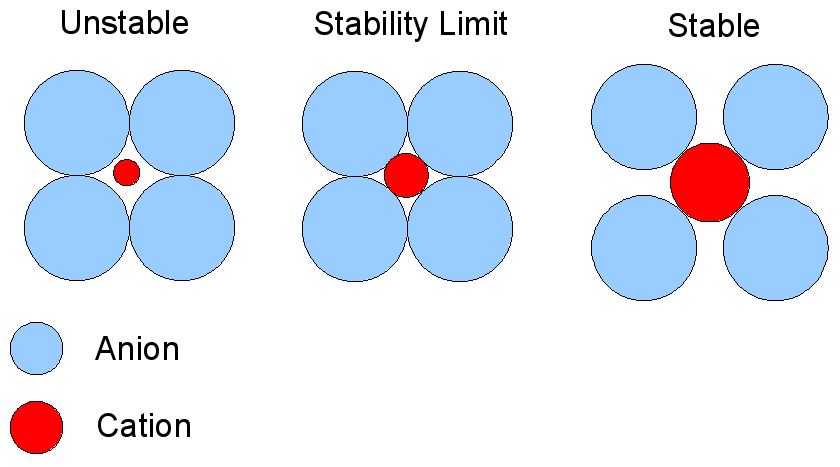
Critical Radius Ratio. This diagram is for octahedral interstices (coordination number six): 4 anions in the plane shown, 1 above the plane and 1 below. The stability limit is at r_{C}/r_{A} = 0.414

The radius ratio rule defines a critical radius ratio for different crystal structures, based on their coordination geometry. The idea is that the anions and cations can be treated as incompressible spheres, meaning the crystal structure can be seen as a kind of unequal sphere packing. The allowed size of the cation for a given structure is determined by the critical radius ratio. If the cation is too small, then it will attract the anions into each other and they will collide hence the compound will be unstable due to anion-anion repulsion; this occurs when the radius ratio drops below the critical radius ratio for that particular structure. At the stability limit the cation is touching all the anions and the anions are just touching at their edges. For radius ratios greater than the critical ratius ratio, the structure is expected to be stable.

The rule is not obeyed for all compounds. By one estimate, the crystal structure can only be guessed about 2/3 of the time. Errors in prediction are partly due to the fact that real chemical compounds are not purely ionic, they display some covalent character.

The table below gives the relation between critical radius ratio, $R$, and coordination number, $CN$, which may be obtained from a simple geometrical proof.

$$R = \sqrt{\tfrac{12}{12-CN}}{-1}$$

Critical Radius Ratio	Coordination number	Type of void	Crystal structure	Examples
0.1547	3	Trigonal planar	α-B_{2}O_{3} structure	B_{2}O_{3}
0.2247	4	Tetrahedral	Zincblende structure	ZnS, CuCl
0.4142	6	Octahedral	Rock salt structure	NaCl, MgO
0.7320	8	Cubic	CsCl structure	CsCl, NH_{4}Br

== History ==
The radius ratio rule was first proposed by Gustav F. Hüttig in 1920. In 1926, Victor Goldschmidt extended the use to ionic lattices. In 1929, the rule was incorporated as the first of Pauling's rules for crystal structures.

== See also ==
- Goldschmidt tolerance factor
- Pauling's rules
- Cubic crystal system
- Sphere packing
