= Born equation =

Equation for Gibbs free energy of solvation

The Born equation can be used for estimating the electrostatic component of Gibbs free energy of solvation of an ion. It is an electrostatic model that treats the solvent as a continuous dielectric medium (it is thus one member of a class of methods known as continuum solvation methods).

The equation was derived by Max Born.
$$\Delta G =- \frac{N_\text{A} z^2 e^2}{8 \pi \varepsilon_0 r_0}\left(1-\frac{1}{\varepsilon_\text{r}}\right)$$
where:

- N_{A} = Avogadro constant
- z = charge of ion
- e = elementary charge, 1.6022×10^{−19} C
- ε_{0} = permittivity of free space
- r_{0} = effective radius of ion
- ε_{r} = dielectric constant of the solvent

== Derivation ==
The energy U stored in an electrostatic field distribution is:
$$U=\frac{1}{2} \varepsilon_0 \varepsilon_\text{r} \int |{\bf{E}}|^2 dV$$
Knowing the magnitude of the electric field of an ion in a medium of dielectric constant ε_{r} is $|{\bf{E}}|=\frac{z e}{4 \pi \varepsilon_0 \varepsilon_{r} r^2}$ and the volume element $dV$ can be expressed as $dV=4\pi r^2 dr$, the energy $U$ can be written as:
$$U=\frac{1}{2} \varepsilon_0 \varepsilon_\text{r} \int_{r_0}^\infty \left(\frac{z e}{4 \pi \varepsilon_0 \varepsilon_\text{r} r^2}\right)^2 4\pi r^2 dr=\frac{z^2 e^2}{8\pi \varepsilon_0 \varepsilon_\text{r} r_0}$$
Thus, the energy of solvation of the ion from gas phase (ε_{r} = 1) to a medium of dielectric constant ε_{r} is:
$$\frac{\Delta G}{N_\text{A}} = U(\varepsilon_\text{r} )- U(\varepsilon_\text{r}=1)=- \frac{z^2 e^2}{8 \pi \varepsilon_0 r_0}\left(1-\frac{1}{\varepsilon_\text{r}}\right)$$
