= Ionic potential =

Ratio of the electrical charge to the radius of an ion

Ionic potential is the ratio of the electrical charge (z) to the radius (r) of an ion.

$\text{Ionic potential} = \frac{\text{electrical charge}}{\text{ionic radius}} = \frac{z}{r}$

As such, this ratio is a measure of the charge density at the surface of the ion; usually the denser the charge, the stronger the bond formed by the ion with ions of opposite charge.

The ionic potential gives an indication of how strongly, or weakly, the ion will be electrostatically attracted by ions of opposite charge; and to what extent the ion will be repelled by ions of the same charge.

Victor Moritz Goldschmidt, the father of modern geochemistry found that the behavior of an element in its environment could be predicted from its ionic potential and illustrated this with a diagram (plot of the bare ionic radius as a function of the ionic charge). For instance, the solubility of dissolved iron is highly dependent on its redox state. Fe^{2+} with a lower ionic potential than Fe^{3+} is much more soluble because it exerts a weaker interaction force with OH^{−} ion present in water and exhibits a less pronounced trend to hydrolysis and precipitation. Under reducing conditions Fe(II) can be present at relatively high concentration in anoxic water, similar to these encountered for other divalent species such as Ca^{2+} and Mg^{2+}. However, once anoxic ground water is pumped from a deep well and is discharged to the surface, it enters in contact with atmospheric oxygen. Then Fe^{2+} is easily oxidized to Fe^{3+} and this latter rapidly hydrolyzes and precipitates because of its lower solubility due to a higher z/r ratio.

Millot (1970) also illustrated the importance of the ionic potential of cations to explain the high, or the low, solubility of minerals and the expansive behaviour (swelling/shrinking) of clay materials.

The ionic potential of the different cations (Na^{+}, K^{+}, Mg^{2+} and Ca^{2+}) present in the interlayer of clay minerals also contribute to explain their swelling/shrinking properties. The more hydrated cations such as Na^{+} and Mg^{2+} are responsible for the swelling of smectite while the less hydrated K^{+} and Ca^{2+} cause the collapse of the interlayer. In illite, the interlayer is totally collapsed because of the presence of the poorly hydrated K^{+}.

Ionic potential is also a measure of the polarising power of a cation.

Ionic potential could be used as a general criterion for the selection of efficient adsorbents for toxic elements.

== See also ==
- Ionization energy
- Metal ions in aqueous solution
- Surface charge
