= Pauling's rules =

Rules to predict ionic compounds' crystal structures

Pauling's rules are five rules published by Linus Pauling in 1929 for predicting and rationalizing the crystal structures of ionic compounds.

== First rule: the radius ratio rule ==
For typical ionic solids, the cations are smaller than the anions, and each cation is surrounded by coordinated anions which form a polyhedron. Ions assemble into a crystal lattice when the lattice energy released by collective packing exceeds the stabilization of isolated ion pairs. The sum of the ionic radii determines the cation-anion distance, while the cation-anion radius ratio $r_+ / r_-$ (or $r_c / r_a$) determines the coordination number (C.N.) of the cation, as well as the shape of the coordinated polyhedron of anions.

For the coordination numbers and corresponding polyhedra in the table below, Pauling mathematically derived the minimum radius ratio for which the cation is in contact with the given number of anions (considering the ions as rigid spheres). If the cation is smaller, it will not be in contact with the anions which results in instability leading to a lower coordination number.

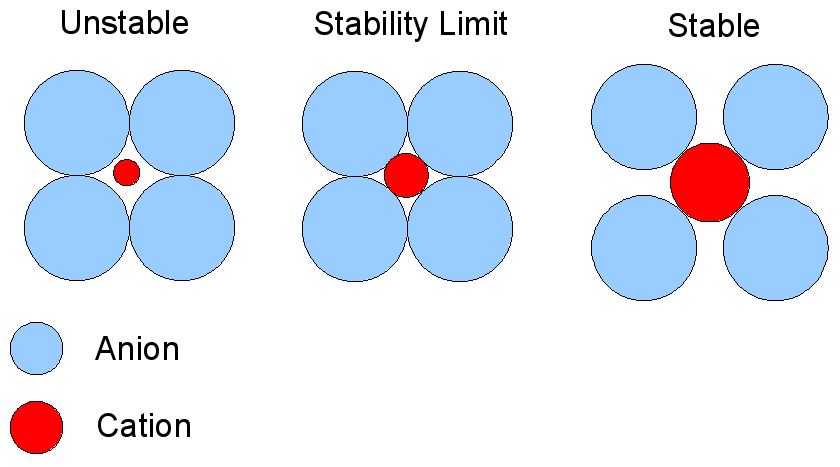
Critical Radius Ratio. This diagram is for coordination number six: 4 anions in the plane shown, 1 above the plane and 1 below. The stability limit is at r_{C}/r_{A} = 0.414

Polyhedron and minimum radius ratio for each coordination number
C.N.	Polyhedron	Radius ratio
3	triangular	0.155
4	tetrahedron	0.225
6	octahedron	0.414
7	capped octahedron	0.592
8	square antiprism (anticube)	0.645
8	cube	0.732
9	triaugmented triangular prism	0.732
12	cuboctahedron	1.00

The three diagrams at right correspond to octahedral coordination with a coordination number of six: four anions in the plane of the diagrams, and two (not shown) above and below this plane. The central diagram shows the minimal radius ratio. The cation and any two anions form a right triangle, with $2r_- = \sqrt 2(r_- + r_+)$, or $\sqrt 2 r_- = r_- + r_+$. Then $r_+ = (\sqrt 2 - 1)r_- = 0.414 r_-$. Similar geometrical proofs yield the minimum radius ratios for the highly symmetrical cases C.N. = 3, 4 and 8.

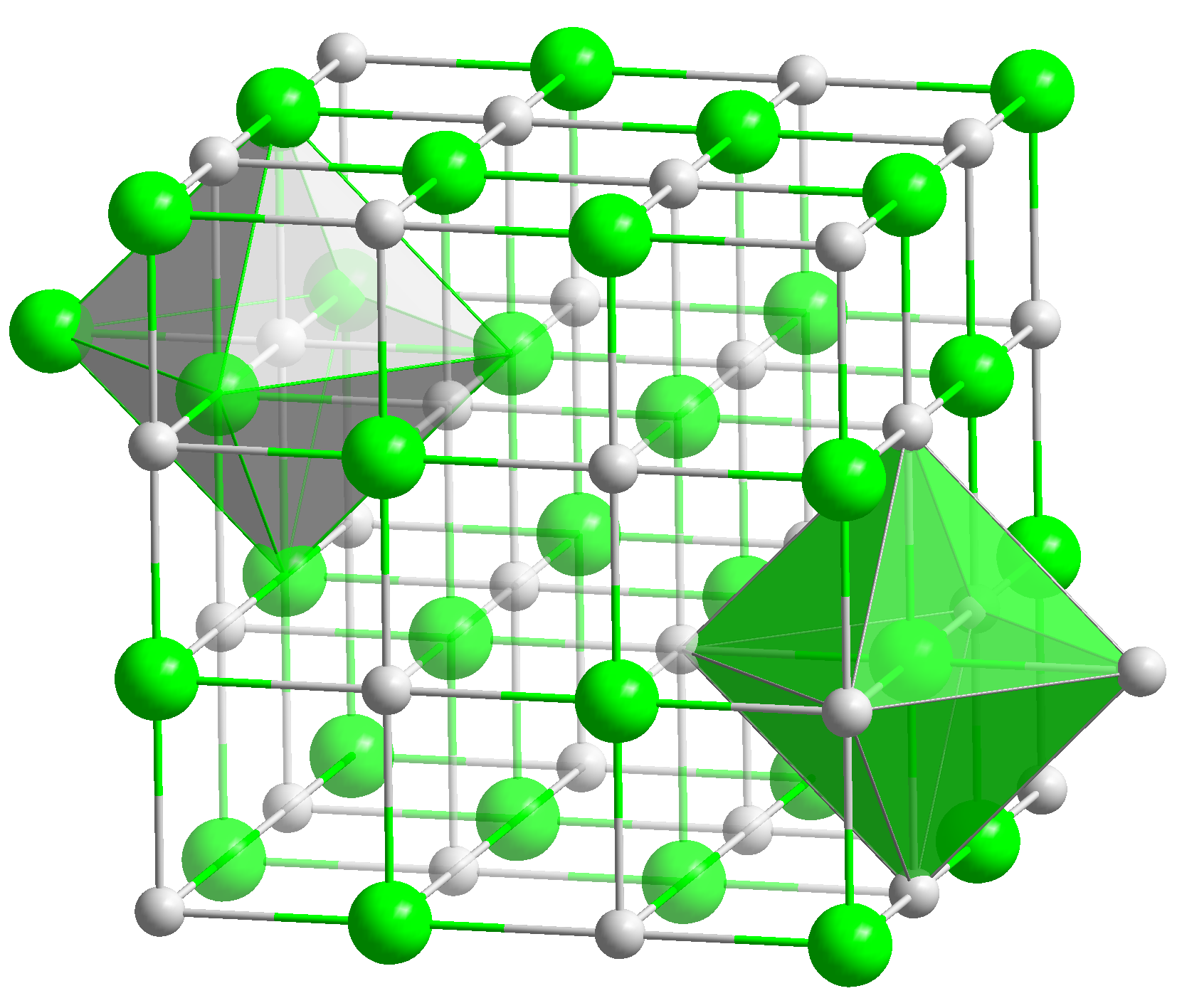
The NaCl crystal structure. Each Na atom has six nearest neighbors, with octahedral geometry.

The CsCl unit cell. Each Cs atom has eight nearest neighbors, with cubic geometry.

For C.N. = 6 and a radius ratio greater than the minimum, the crystal is more stable since the cation is still in contact with six anions, but the anions are further from each other so that their mutual repulsion is reduced. An octahedron may then form with a radius ratio greater than or equal to 0.414, but as the ratio rises above 0.732, a cubic geometry becomes more stable. This explains why Na^{+} in NaCl with a radius ratio of 0.55 has octahedral coordination, whereas Cs^{+} in CsCl with a radius ratio of 0.93 has cubic coordination.

If the radius ratio is less than the minimum, two anions will tend to depart and the remaining four will rearrange into a tetrahedral geometry where they are all in contact with the cation.

The radius ratio rules are a first approximation which have some success in predicting coordination numbers, but many exceptions do exist. In a set of over 5000 oxides, only 66% of coordination environments agree with Pauling's first rule. Oxides formed with alkali or alkali-earth metal cations that contain multiple cation coordinations are common deviations from this rule.

== Second rule: the electrostatic valence rule ==
For a given cation, Pauling defined the electrostatic bond strength to each coordinated anion as $s = \frac{z}{\nu}$, where z is the cation charge and ν is the cation coordination number. A stable ionic structure is arranged to preserve local electroneutrality, so that the sum of the strengths of the electrostatic bonds to an anion equals the charge on that anion.

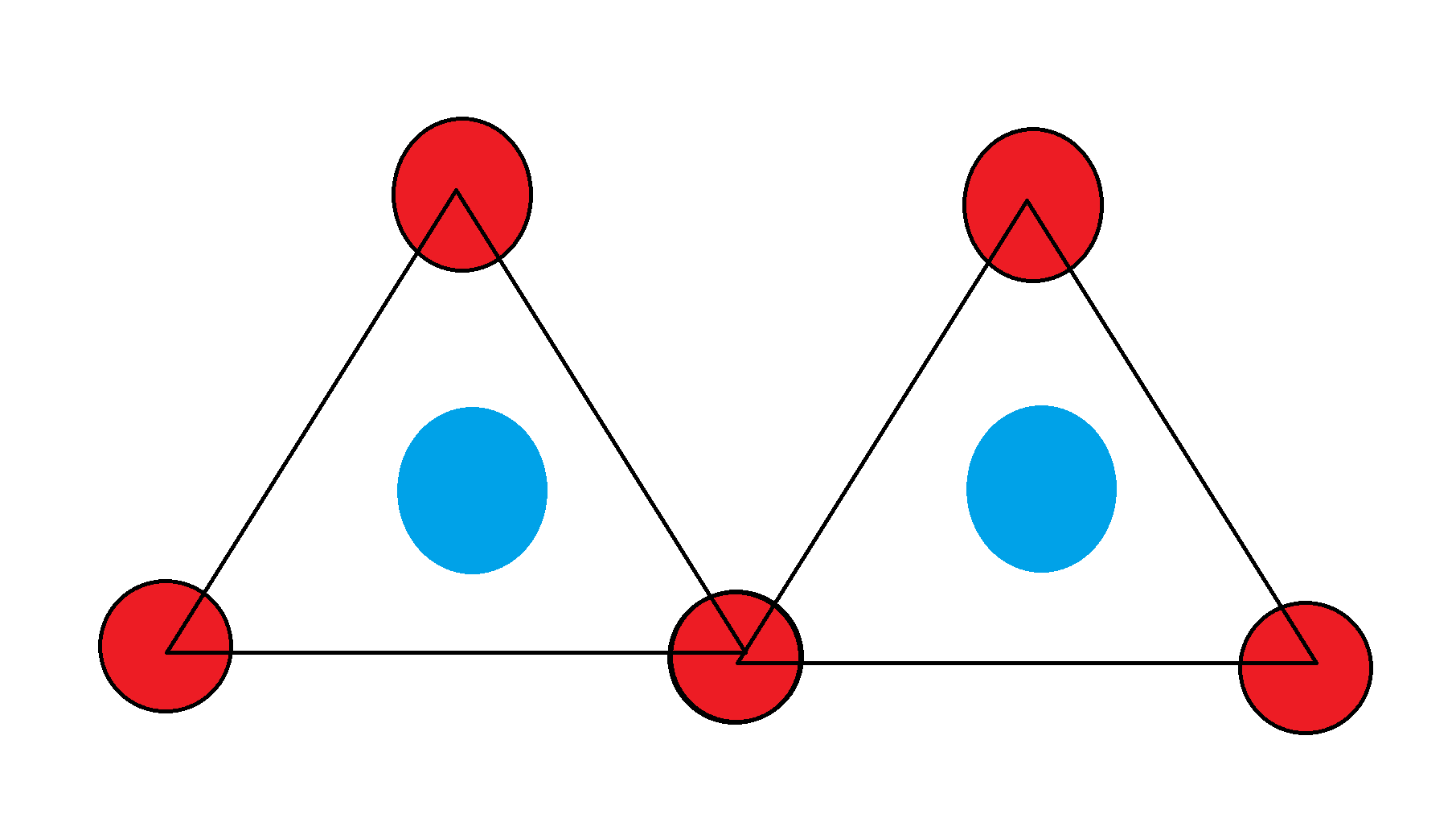
Corner-sharing tetrahedra

$$\xi = \sum_{i} s_i$$

where $\xi$ is the anion charge and the summation is over the adjacent cations. For simple solids, the $s_i$ are equal for all cations coordinated to a given anion, so that the anion coordination number is the anion charge divided by each electrostatic bond strength. Some examples are given in the table.

Cations with oxide O^{2−} ion
Cation	Radius ratio	Cation C.N.	Electrostatic bond strength	Anion C.N.
Li^{+}	0.34	4	0.25	8
Mg^{2+}	0.47	6	0.33	6
Sc^{3+}	0.60	6	0.5	4

Pauling showed that this rule is useful in limiting the possible structures to consider for more complex crystals such as the aluminosilicate mineral orthoclase, KAlSi_{3}O_{8}, with three different cations. However, from data analysis of oxides from the Inorganic Crystal Structure Database (ICSD), the result showed that only 20% of all oxygen atoms matched with the prediction from second rule (using a cutoff of 0.01).

== Third rule: sharing of polyhedron corners, edges and faces ==
The sharing of edges and particularly faces by two anion polyhedra decreases the stability of an ionic structure. Sharing of corners does not decrease stability as much, so (for example) octahedra may share corners with one another.

The decrease in stability is due to the fact that sharing edges and faces places cations in closer proximity to each other, so that cation-cation electrostatic repulsion is increased. The effect is largest for cations with high charge and low C.N. (especially when r+/r- approaches the lower limit of the polyhedral stability). Generally, smaller elements fulfill the rule better.

As one example, Pauling considered the three mineral forms of titanium dioxide, each with a coordination number of 6 for the Ti^{4+} cations. The most stable (and most abundant) form is rutile, in which the coordination octahedra are arranged so that each one shares only two edges (and no faces) with adjoining octahedra. The other two, less stable, forms are brookite and anatase, in which each octahedron shares three and four edges respectively with adjoining octahedra.

== Fourth rule: crystals containing different cations ==
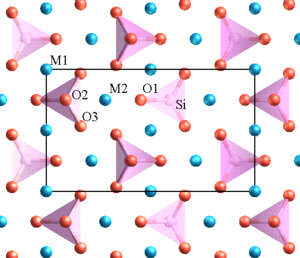
Structure of olivine. M (Mg or Fe) = blue spheres, Si = pink tetrahedra, O = red spheres.

In a crystal containing different cations, those of high valency and small coordination number tend not to share polyhedron elements with one another. This rule tends to increase the distance between highly charged cations, so as to reduce the electrostatic repulsion between them.

One of Pauling's examples is olivine, M_{2}SiO_{4}, where M is a mixture of Mg^{2+} at some sites and Fe^{2+} at others. The structure contains distinct SiO_{4} tetrahedra which do not share any oxygens (at corners, edges or faces) with each other. The lower-valence Mg^{2+} and Fe^{2+} cations are surrounded by polyhedra which do share oxygens.

== Fifth rule: the rule of parsimony ==
The number of essentially different kinds of constituents in a crystal tends to be small. The repeating units will tend to be identical because each atom in the structure is most stable in a specific environment. There may be two or three types of polyhedra, such as tetrahedra or octahedra, but there will not be many different types.

== Limitation ==
In a study of 5000 oxides, 66% satisfy the first rule and only 13% of them satisfy all of the last 4 rules indicating limited universality of Pauling's rules. The first rule was excluded since it strongly depends on the choice of ionic radii. The authors also suggest that limiting the application of the rules to certain compounds might improve its success rate. Restricting the rules to select chemical families does not appear to be useful as even chemically similar elements behave very differently. Lastly, eliminating environments with large coordination numbers (greater than 8) yields better results with the third and fourth rules.

== See also ==
- Goldschmidt tolerance factor
- Octet rule
