= Pentamagnesium digallide =

Names
- IUPAC name Pentamagnesium digallide
- Other names: Magnesium gallide(−V)

Identifiers
CAS Number	12064-14-1
3D model (JSmol)	Interactive image
ChemSpider	24593579
PubChem CID	78062207
CompTox Dashboard (EPA)	DTXSID30779590
- InChI: InChI=1S/2Ga.5Mg Key: BHKRUXZCMMTJBB-UHFFFAOYSA-N
- SMILES: [Mg+2].[Mg+2].[Mg+2].[Mg+2].[Mg+2].[Ga-5].[Ga-5]

Properties
Chemical formula	Mg_{5}Ga_{2}
Molar mass	260.97 g/mol
Appearance	White crystalline solid
Density	3.08 g/cm^{3}
Melting point	456 °C (853 °F; 729 K)

Structure
Crystal structure	Orthorhombic
Space group	Ibam
Point group	mmm
Lattice constant	a = 13.71 Å, b = 7.02 Å, c = 6.02 Å
Lattice volume (V)	579.06 Å^{3}

Thermochemistry
Std enthalpy of formation (Δ_{f}H^{⦵}_{298})	-206.5 kJ/mol (calculated)
- Except where otherwise noted, data are given for materials in their standard state (at 25 °C [77 °F], 100 kPa). Infobox references

Pentamagnesium digallide, also known as magnesium gallide(−V), is a chemical compound in the family of magnesium gallides (Mg_{x}Ga_{y}). This compound has gallium in the rare oxidation state −5 and is produced by splat quenching of a molten mixture of magnesium and gallium metal then heating the resulting substance to 350 °C:

5Mg + 2Ga → Mg_{5}Ga_{2}

It is an unwanted product when magnesium-gallium alloys are exposed to high temperatures.
