= Ionic radius =

Radius of an atomic ion in crystals

Ionic radius, r_{ion}, is the radius of a monatomic ion in an ionic crystal structure. Although neither atoms nor ions have sharp boundaries, they are treated as if they were hard spheres with radii such that the sum of ionic radii of the cation and anion gives the distance between the ions in a crystal lattice. Ionic radii are typically given in units of either picometers (pm) or angstroms (Å), with 1 Å = 100 pm. Typical values range from 31 pm (0.3 Å) to over 200 pm (2 Å).

The concept can be extended to solvated ions in liquid solutions taking into consideration the solvation shell.

== Trends ==
X^{−}	NaX	AgX
F	464	492
Cl	564	555
Br	598	577
Unit cell parameters (in pm, equal to two M–X bond lengths) for sodium and silver halides. All compounds crystallize in the NaCl structure.

Relative radii of atoms and ions. The neutral atoms are colored gray, cations red, and anions blue.

Ions may be larger or smaller than the neutral atom, depending on the ion's electric charge. When an atom loses an electron to form a cation, the other electrons are more attracted to the nucleus, and the radius of the ion gets smaller. Similarly, when an electron is added to an atom, forming an anion, the added electron increases the size of the electron cloud by interelectronic repulsion.

The ionic radius is not a fixed property of a given ion, but varies with coordination number, spin state and other parameters. Nevertheless, ionic radius values are sufficiently transferable to allow periodic trends to be recognized. As with other types of atomic radius, ionic radii increase on descending a group. Ionic size (for the same ion) also increases with increasing coordination number, and an ion in a high-spin state will be larger than the same ion in a low-spin state. In general, ionic radius decreases with increasing positive charge and increases with increasing negative charge.

An "anomalous" ionic radius in a crystal is often a sign of significant covalent character in the bonding. No bond is completely ionic, and some supposedly "ionic" compounds, especially of the transition metals, are particularly covalent in character. This is illustrated by the unit cell parameters for sodium and silver halides in the table. On the basis of the fluorides, one would say that Ag^{+} is larger than Na^{+}, but on the basis of the chlorides and bromides the opposite appears to be true. This is because the greater covalent character of the bonds in AgCl and AgBr reduces the bond length and hence the apparent ionic radius of Ag^{+}, an effect which is not present in the halides of the more electropositive sodium, nor in silver fluoride in which the fluoride ion is relatively unpolarizable.

== Determination ==
The distance between two ions in an ionic crystal can be determined by X-ray crystallography, which gives the lengths of the sides of the unit cell of a crystal. For example, the length of each edge of the unit cell of sodium chloride is found to be 564.02 pm. Each edge of the unit cell of sodium chloride may be considered to have the atoms arranged as Na^{+}∙∙∙Cl^{−}∙∙∙Na^{+}, so the edge is twice the Na-Cl separation. Therefore, the distance between the Na^{+} and Cl^{−} ions is half of 564.02 pm, which is 282.01 pm. However, although X-ray crystallography gives the distance between ions, it doesn't indicate where the boundary is between those ions, so it doesn't directly give ionic radii.

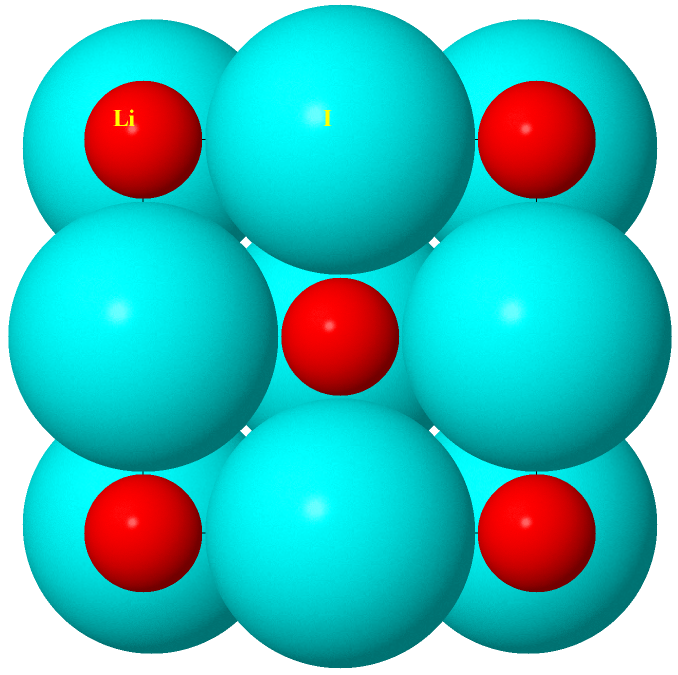
Front view of the unit cell of an LiI crystal, using Shannon's crystal data (Li^{+} = 90 pm; I^{−} = 206 pm). The iodide ions nearly touch (but don't quite), indicating that Landé's assumption is fairly good.

Landé estimated ionic radii by considering crystals in which the anion and cation have a large difference in size, such as LiI. The lithium ions are so much smaller than the iodide ions that the lithium fits into holes within the crystal lattice, allowing the iodide ions to touch. That is, the distance between two neighboring iodides in the crystal is assumed to be twice the radius of the iodide ion, which was deduced to be 214 pm. This value can be used to determine other radii. For example, the inter-ionic distance in RbI is 356 pm, giving 142 pm for the ionic radius of Rb^{+}. In this way values for the radii of 8 ions were determined.

Wasastjerna estimated ionic radii by considering the relative volumes of ions as determined from electrical polarizability as determined by measurements of refractive index. These results were extended by Victor Goldschmidt. Both Wasastjerna and Goldschmidt used a value of 132 pm for the O^{2−} ion.

Pauling used effective nuclear charge to proportion the distance between ions into anionic and a cationic radii. His data gives the O^{2−} ion a radius of 140 pm.

A major review of crystallographic data led Shannon to publish revised ionic radii. Shannon gives different radii for different coordination numbers, and for high and low spin states of the ions. To be consistent with Pauling's radii, Shannon has used a value of r_{ion}(O^{2−}) = 140 pm; data using that value are referred to as "effective" ionic radii. However, Shannon also includes data based on r_{ion}(O^{2−}) = 126 pm; data using that value are referred to as "crystal" ionic radii. Shannon states that "it is felt that crystal radii correspond more closely to the physical size of ions in a solid." The two sets of data are listed in the two tables below.

== Tables ==
Crystal ionic radii in pm of elements as a function of ionic charge and spin (ls = low spin, hs = high spin). Ions are 6-coordinate unless indicated differently in parentheses (e.g. "146 (4)" for 4-coordinate N^{3−}).
Number	Name	Symbol	3−	2−	1−	1+	2+	3+	4+	5+	6+	7+	8+
1	Hydrogen	H			208	−4 (2)							
3	Lithium	Li				90							
4	Beryllium	Be					59						
5	Boron	B						41					
6	Carbon	C							30				
7	Nitrogen	N	132 (4)					30		27			
8	Oxygen	O		126									
9	Fluorine	F			119							22	
11	Sodium	Na				116							
12	Magnesium	Mg					86						
13	Aluminium	Al						67.5					
14	Silicon	Si							54				
15	Phosphorus	P						58		52			
16	Sulfur	S		170					51		43		
17	Chlorine	Cl			167					26 (3py)		41	
19	Potassium	K				152							
20	Calcium	Ca					114						
21	Scandium	Sc						88.5					
22	Titanium	Ti					100	81	74.5				
23	Vanadium	V					93	78	72	68			
24	Chromium ls	Cr					87	75.5	69	63	58		
24	Chromium hs	Cr					94						
25	Manganese ls	Mn					81	72	67	47 (4)	39.5 (4)	60	
25	Manganese hs	Mn					97	78.5					
26	Iron ls	Fe					75	69	72.5		39 (4)		
26	Iron hs	Fe					92	78.5					
27	Cobalt ls	Co					79	68.5					
27	Cobalt hs	Co					88.5	75	67				
28	Nickel ls	Ni					83	70	62				
28	Nickel hs	Ni						74					
29	Copper	Cu				91	87	68 ls					
30	Zinc	Zn					88						
31	Gallium	Ga						76					
32	Germanium	Ge					87		67				
33	Arsenic	As						72		60			
34	Selenium	Se		184					64		56		
35	Bromine	Br			182			73 (4sq)		45 (3py)		53	
37	Rubidium	Rb				166							
38	Strontium	Sr					132						
39	Yttrium	Y						104					
40	Zirconium	Zr							86				
41	Niobium	Nb						86	82	78			
42	Molybdenum	Mo						83	79	75	73		
43	Technetium	Tc							78.5	74		70	
44	Ruthenium	Ru						82	76	70.5		52 (4)	50 (4)
45	Rhodium	Rh						80.5	74	69			
46	Palladium	Pd				73 (2)	100	90	75.5				
47	Silver	Ag				129	108	89					
48	Cadmium	Cd					109						
49	Indium	In						94					
50	Tin	Sn							83				
51	Antimony	Sb						90		74			
52	Tellurium	Te		207					111		70		
53	Iodine	I			206					109		67	
54	Xenon	Xe											62
55	Caesium	Cs				181							
56	Barium	Ba					149						
57	Lanthanum	La						117.2					
58	Cerium	Ce						115	101				
59	Praseodymium	Pr						113	99				
60	Neodymium	Nd					143 (8)	112.3					
61	Promethium	Pm						111					
62	Samarium	Sm					136 (7)	109.8					
63	Europium	Eu					131	108.7					
64	Gadolinium	Gd						107.8					
65	Terbium	Tb						106.3	90				
66	Dysprosium	Dy					121	105.2					
67	Holmium	Ho						104.1					
68	Erbium	Er						103					
69	Thulium	Tm					117	102					
70	Ytterbium	Yb					116	100.8					
71	Lutetium	Lu						100.1					
72	Hafnium	Hf							85				
73	Tantalum	Ta						86	82	78			
74	Tungsten	W							80	76	74		
75	Rhenium	Re							77	72	69	67	
76	Osmium	Os							77	71.5	68.5	66.5	53 (4)
77	Iridium	Ir						82	76.5	71			
78	Platinum	Pt					94		76.5	71			
79	Gold	Au				151		99		71			
80	Mercury	Hg				133	116						
81	Thallium	Tl				164		102.5					
82	Lead	Pb					133		91.5				
83	Bismuth	Bi						117		90			
84	Polonium	Po							108		81		
85	Astatine	At										76	
87	Francium	Fr				194							
88	Radium	Ra					162 (8)						
89	Actinium	Ac						126					
90	Thorium	Th							108				
91	Protactinium	Pa						116	104	92			
92	Uranium	U						116.5	103	90	87		
93	Neptunium	Np					124	115	101	89	86	85	
94	Plutonium	Pu						114	100	88	85		
95	Americium	Am					140 (8)	111.5	99				
96	Curium	Cm						111	99				
97	Berkelium	Bk						110	97				
98	Californium	Cf						109	96.1				
99	Einsteinium	Es						92.8					

Effective ionic radii in pm of elements as a function of ionic charge and spin (ls = low spin, hs = high spin). Ions are 6-coordinate unless indicated differently in parentheses (e.g. "146 (4)" for 4-coordinate N^{3−}).
Number	Name	Symbol	3−	2−	1−	1+	2+	3+	4+	5+	6+	7+	8+
1	Hydrogen	H			139.9	−18 (2)							
3	Lithium	Li				76							
4	Beryllium	Be					45						
5	Boron	B						27					
6	Carbon	C							16				
7	Nitrogen	N	146 (4)					16		13			
8	Oxygen	O		140									
9	Fluorine	F			133							8	
11	Sodium	Na				102							
12	Magnesium	Mg					72						
13	Aluminium	Al						53.5					
14	Silicon	Si							40				
15	Phosphorus	P	212					44		38			
16	Sulfur	S		184					37		29		
17	Chlorine	Cl			181					12 (3py)		27	
19	Potassium	K				138							
20	Calcium	Ca					100						
21	Scandium	Sc						74.5					
22	Titanium	Ti					86	67	60.5				
23	Vanadium	V					79	64	58	54			
24	Chromium ls	Cr					73	61.5	55	49	44		
24	Chromium hs	Cr					80						
25	Manganese ls	Mn					67	58	53	33 (4)	25.5 (4)	46	
25	Manganese hs	Mn					83	64.5					
26	Iron ls	Fe					61	55	58.5		25 (4)		
26	Iron hs	Fe					78	64.5					
27	Cobalt ls	Co					65	54.5					
27	Cobalt hs	Co					74.5	61	53				
28	Nickel ls	Ni					69	56	48				
28	Nickel hs	Ni						60					
29	Copper	Cu				77	73	54 ls					
30	Zinc	Zn					74						
31	Gallium	Ga						62					
32	Germanium	Ge					73		53				
33	Arsenic	As						58		46			
34	Selenium	Se		198					50		42		
35	Bromine	Br			196			59 (4sq)		31 (3py)		39	
37	Rubidium	Rb				152							
38	Strontium	Sr					118						
39	Yttrium	Y						90					
40	Zirconium	Zr							72				
41	Niobium	Nb						72	68	64			
42	Molybdenum	Mo						69	65	61	59		
43	Technetium	Tc							64.5	60		56	
44	Ruthenium	Ru						68	62	56.5		38 (4)	36 (4)
45	Rhodium	Rh						66.5	60	55			
46	Palladium	Pd				59 (2)	86	76	61.5				
47	Silver	Ag				115	94	75					
48	Cadmium	Cd					95						
49	Indium	In						80					
50	Tin	Sn					102		69				
51	Antimony	Sb						76		60			
52	Tellurium	Te		221					97		56		
53	Iodine	I			220					95		53	
54	Xenon	Xe											48
55	Caesium	Cs				167							
56	Barium	Ba					135						
57	Lanthanum	La						103.2					
58	Cerium	Ce						101	87				
59	Praseodymium	Pr						99	85				
60	Neodymium	Nd					129 (8)	98.3					
61	Promethium	Pm						97					
62	Samarium	Sm					122 (7)	95.8					
63	Europium	Eu					117	94.7					
64	Gadolinium	Gd						93.5					
65	Terbium	Tb						92.3	76				
66	Dysprosium	Dy					107	91.2					
67	Holmium	Ho						90.1					
68	Erbium	Er						89					
69	Thulium	Tm					103	88					
70	Ytterbium	Yb					102	86.8					
71	Lutetium	Lu						86.1					
72	Hafnium	Hf							71				
73	Tantalum	Ta						72	68	64			
74	Tungsten	W							66	62	60		
75	Rhenium	Re							63	58	55	53	
76	Osmium	Os							63	57.5	54.5	52.5	39 (4)
77	Iridium	Ir						68	62.5	57			
78	Platinum	Pt					80		62.5	57			
79	Gold	Au				137		85		57			
80	Mercury	Hg				119	102						
81	Thallium	Tl				150		88.5					
82	Lead	Pb					119		77.5				
83	Bismuth	Bi						103		76			
84	Polonium	Po		223					94		67		
85	Astatine	At										62	
87	Francium	Fr				180							
88	Radium	Ra					148 (8)						
89	Actinium	Ac						106.5 (6); 122.0 (9)					
90	Thorium	Th							94				
91	Protactinium	Pa						104	90	78			
92	Uranium	U						102.5	89	76	73		
93	Neptunium	Np					110	101	87	75	72	71	
94	Plutonium	Pu						100	86	74	71		
95	Americium	Am					126 (8)	97.5	85				
96	Curium	Cm						97	85				
97	Berkelium	Bk						96	83				
98	Californium	Cf						95	82.1				
99	Einsteinium	Es						83.5					

== Soft-sphere model ==
Soft-sphere ionic radii (in pm) of some ions
Cation, M	R_{M}	Anion, X	R_{X}
Li^{+}	109.4	Cl^{−}	218.1
Na^{+}	149.7	Br^{−}	237.2

For many compounds, the model of ions as hard spheres does not reproduce the distance between ions, ${d_{mx}}$, to the accuracy with which it can be measured in crystals. One approach to improving the calculated accuracy is to model ions as "soft spheres" that overlap in the crystal. Because the ions overlap, their separation in the crystal will be less than the sum of their soft-sphere radii.

The relation between soft-sphere ionic radii, ${r_m}$ and ${r_x}$, and ${d_{mx}}$, is given by

$${d_{mx}}^k = {r_m}^k + {r_x}^k$$,

where $k$ is an exponent that varies with the type of crystal structure. In the hard-sphere model, $k$ would be 1, giving ${d_{mx}} = {r_m} + {r_x}$.

Comparison between observed and calculated ion separations (in pm)
MX	Observed	Soft-sphere model
LiCl	257.0	257.2
LiBr	275.1	274.4
NaCl	282.0	281.9
NaBr	298.7	298.2

In the soft-sphere model, $k$ has a value between 1 and 2. For example, for crystals of group 1 halides with the sodium chloride structure, a value of 1.6667 gives good agreement with experiment. Some soft-sphere ionic radii are in the table. These radii are larger than the crystal radii given above (Li^{+}, 90 pm; Cl^{−}, 167 pm). Inter-ionic separations calculated with these radii give remarkably good agreement with experimental values. Some data are given in the table. Curiously, no theoretical justification for the equation containing $k$ has been given.

== Non-spherical ions ==
The concept of ionic radii is based on the assumption of a spherical ion shape. However, from a group-theoretical point of view the assumption is only justified for ions that reside on high-symmetry crystal lattice sites like Na and Cl in halite or Zn and S in sphalerite. A clear distinction can be made, when the point symmetry group of the respective lattice site is considered, which are the cubic groups O_{h} and T_{d} in NaCl and ZnS. For ions on lower-symmetry sites significant deviations of their electron density from a spherical shape may occur. This holds in particular for ions on lattice sites of polar symmetry, which are the crystallographic point groups C_{1}, C_{1h}, C_{n} or C_{nv}, n = 2, 3, 4 or 6. A thorough analysis of the bonding geometry was recently carried out for pyrite-type compounds, where monovalent chalcogen ions reside on C_{3} lattice sites. It was found that chalcogen ions have to be modeled by ellipsoidal charge distributions with different radii along the symmetry axis and perpendicular to it.

== See also ==
- Atomic orbital
- Atomic radii of the elements
- Born equation
- Covalent radius
- Electride
- Ionic potential
- Ionic radius ratio
- Pauling's rules
- Stokes radius
- Van der Waals radius
