= Stock nomenclature =

Inorganic compound notation system

Stock nomenclature for inorganic compounds is a widely used system of chemical nomenclature developed by the German chemist Alfred Stock and first published in 1919. In the "Stock system", the oxidation states of some or all of the elements in a compound are indicated in parentheses by Roman numerals.

== Style ==
Contrary to the usual English style for parentheses, there is no space between the end of the element name and the opening parenthesis: for AgF, the correct style is "silver(I) fluoride" not "silver (I) fluoride".

Where there is no ambiguity about the oxidation state of an element in a compound, it is not necessary to indicate it with Roman numerals: hence for NaCl, sodium chloride will suffice; sodium(I) chloride(−I) is unnecessarily long and such usage is very rare.

== Examples ==
- FeCl_{2}: iron(II) chloride
- FeCl_{3}: iron(III) chloride
- KMnO_{4}: potassium manganate(VII) (rarely used except in pre-university education; potassium permanganate is ubiquitous)
- [Co(NH_{3})_{6}]^{3+}: hexaamminecobalt(III)

=== Mixed-valence compounds ===
- Co_{3}O_{4}: cobalt(II,III) oxide. Co_{3}O_{4} is a mixed-valence compound that is more accurately described as Co^{II}Co^{III}_{2}O_{4}, i.e. [Co^{2+}][Co^{3+}]_{2}[O^{2−}]_{4}.
- Sb_{2}O_{4}: antimony(III,V) oxide. Sb_{2}O_{4} is better formulated as Sb^{III}Sb^{V}O_{4}, i.e. [Sb^{3+}][Sb^{5+}][O^{2−}]_{4}.

== See also ==
- IUPAC nomenclature of inorganic chemistry
